This is a list of rural localities in Vologda Oblast. Vologda Oblast is a federal subject of Russia (an oblast). Its administrative center is Vologda. Population: 1,202,444 (2010 Census).

Babayevsky District 
Rural localities in Babayevsky District:

Babushkinsky District 
Rural localities in Babushkinsky District:

Belozersky District 
Rural localities in Belozersky District:

Chagodoshchensky District 
Rural localities in Chagodoshchensky District:

 Alexeyevskoye
 Anishino
 Anisimovo
 Babushkino
 Baranovo
 Belskoye
 Belye Kresty
 Berezye
 Borisovo
 Bortnikovo
 Chagoda
 Cherenskoye
 Chikusovo
 Dubrova
 Fishovo
 Fryazino
 Gora
 Grechnevo
 Grigoryevo
 Ignashino
 Izboishchi
 Kabozha
 Kharchikha
 Klypino
 Kochubino
 Kolobovo
 Kostyleva Gora
 Kotovo
 Krasnaya Gorka
 Leshutino
 Leshutinskaya Gora
 Lukinskoye
 Lvov Dvor
 Makhovo
 Malashkino
 Mardas
 Maryino
 Megrino
 Metelishchi
 Mishino
 Naumovskoye
 Niz
 Novaya
 Novinka
 Oksyukovo
 Okulovo
 Olisovo
 Osipovo
 Panik
 Pervomaysky
 Podlipye
 Pokrovskoye
 Puchnino
 Pustyn
 Remenevo
 Selishche
 Semovo
 Seredka
 Sholokhovo
 Sirotovo
 Smerdomsky
 Trukhino
 Trukhnovo
 Usadishchi
 Valun
 Valye
 Yerokhovo
 Zagorye
 Zalozno
 Zaruchevye
 Zhernovitsy
 Zubovo

Cherepovetsky District 
Rural localities in Cherepovetsky District:

 Abakanovo
 Afanasovo
 Akinkhovo
 Anashkino
 Andogsky
 Anfalovo
 Anisimovka
 Annino
 Antonovo
 Arkhangelskoye
 Avdeyevskaya
 Baranovo
 Barskoye Pole
 Baskakovo
 Batran
 Batransky
 Bavlenskoye
 Beketovo
 Belavino
 Berezovik
 Bocheyno
 Bolshaya Dora
 Bolshaya Dubrovka
 Bolshaya Novinka
 Bolshaya Shormanga
 Bolshiye Strazhi
 Bolshiye Ugly
 Bolshoy Istok
 Bolshoye Kalinnikovo
 Bolshoye Krasnovo
 Bolshoye Novo
 Bor
 Borok
 Botilo
 Botovo
 Braslavl
 Brod
 Burtsevo
 Buzakovo
 Bykovo
 Bystrino
 Chabino
 Chastobovo
 Chayevo
 Chechino
 Chernevo
 Chikeyevo
 Chikovo
 Chuksha
 Dargun
 Davydovo
 Dementyevo
 Demidovo
 Deminskaya
 Demyanka
 Derevnishcha
 Dermyaninskoye
 Dmitriyevo
 Dobrynskoye
 Dolgusha
 Dora
 Dorka
 Dorki
 Dorofeyevo
 Doronino
 Dubnishnoye
 Dubrovo
 Fedorkovo
 Fedosovo
 Fenevo
 Filippovo
 Firyutino
 Fokino
 Fominskoye
 Frolkovo
 Galinskoye
 Ganino
 Gavino
 Glinskoye
 Glukhaya Lokhta
 Gora
 Gorely Pochinok
 Gorka-Zarechye
 Gorodishche
 Gosha
 Grenevo
 Grigorevo
 Grigoryevo
 Grigoryevskoye
 Grishutino
 Gurlevo
 Ignatyevo
 Ilmovik
 Ilyina Gora
 Ionovo
 Irdomatka
 Iskra
 Ivanovo
 Ivanovskoye
 Ivantsevo
 Kachalka
 Karelskaya Mushnya
 Kargach
 Karmanitsa
 Katayevo
 Katilovo
 Khantanovo
 Kharinskaya
 Kharlamovskaya
 Khemalda
 Khlamovo
 Khmelevoye
 Khmelina
 Khutorok
 Khvoshchevik
 Kiselevo
 Kizboy
 Klimovo
 Klimovskaya
 Klimovskoye
 Klopuzovo
 Kodino
 Koino
 Kokorevo
 Kolkach
 Konechnoye
 Korablevo
 Kornigovka
 Korotnevo
 Korotovo
 Kostenevo
 Kostyayevka
 Kostyayevo
 Kotovo
 Kozokhta
 Kraskovo
 Krasny Dvor
 Krivets
 Krominskaya
 Krylovo
 Kuksino
 Kumino
 Kunshino
 Kurgan
 Kurtsevo
 Kuryakovo
 Kustets
 Kuzmino
 Ladygino
 Laptevo
 Lavrovo
 Ledinino
 Lenino
 Leontyevka
 Leontyevo
 Lesnoye
 Likhachevo
 Lipnik
 Litvinovo
 Lokhta
 Losha
 Lukinskoye
 Lysaya Gora
 Makoveyevo
 Maksakovo
 Makutino
 Malata
 Malaya Dora
 Malaya Dubrovka
 Malaya Lipenka
 Malaya Shormanga
 Malechkino
 Maloye Kalinnikovo
 Maloye Novo
 Maltsevo
 Maly Istok
 Malye Strazhi
 Malye Ugly
 Markhinino
 Maryinskaya
 Maslovo
 Meleda
 Mikhaylovskoye
 Mikheyevo
 Mindyukino
 Minino
 Mishino
 Mitenskoye
 Molokovo
 Mukhino
 Muravyovo
 Muzga
 Myaksa
 Mydyevo
 Myshkino
 Nadporozhye
 Nazarovskaya
 Nekrasovo
 Nelazskoye
 Nesterovskoye
 Neverov Bor
 Nikolo-Ramenye
 Nikolskoye
 Nikulino
 Nizhny Angoboy
 Nosovskoye
 Nova
 Novaya Derevnya
 Novaya Svobodka
 Novaya Yagnitsa
 Novaya
 Novodubrovka
 Novogorodovo
 Novosela
 Novotryumovo
 Novoye Domozerovo
 Novoye Zakharovo
 Nyagoslovo
 Nyankino
 Ochenikovo
 Oseyevskaya
 Ozero
 Pakhotino
 Panteleymonovskoye
 Parshino
 Pastoch
 Patino
 Pavlichevo
 Pavlokovo
 Pavlovo
 Pavlovskoye
 Pazhetskoye
 Perkhino
 Pesye
 Petrakovo
 Petrino
 Petrovskoye
 Piyevo
 Plenishnik
 Pleshanovo
 Ploskovo
 Ploskoye
 Pokrov
 Pokrovskoye
 Polezhayevo
 Poluyevo
 Povarovo
 Prislon
 Privalino
 Prokshino
 Pronino
 Pustoshka
 Rabotino
 Roshchino
 Roslino
 Ruchyi
 Ruzhbovo
 Ryabovo
 Ryazan
 Ryzhkovo
 Sandalovo
 Sannikovo
 Selishche
 Selivanovo
 Seltsa
 Seltso-Ryabovo
 Sergeyevo
 Shabanova Gora
 Shalimovo
 Shchetinskoye
 Shelkovo
 Shepelevo
 Sheyno
 Shilovka
 Shilovo
 Shishovka
 Shukhobod
 Shuklino
 Shurovo
 Skovyatino
 Slabeyevo
 Slobodino
 Sobolevo
 Sokolnikovo
 Solmanskoye
 Sosnovka
 Soyvolovskaya
 Spas-Lom
 Spirovo
 Sredneye
 Sredniye Chudi
 Stariki
 Staroye Domozerovo
 Staroye Zakharovo
 Stepanovo
 Stepantsevo
 Suda
 Sukovatka
 Sumino
 Supronovo
 Surkovo
 Suzorovo
 Sychevo
 Tekar
 Tekutovo
 Tereben
 Terekhovo
 Terino
 Timovo
 Titovo
 Tokovye
 Tolstikovo
 Tonshalovo
 Travlivka
 Trofankovo
 Trofimovo
 Troitskoye
 Trushnevo
 Tsarevo
 Tsikovo
 Turmanskoye
 Tyabunino
 Tynovo
 Tyushkovo
 Tyutnevo
 Ugryumovo
 Ulazorsky
 Uloma
 Ulyanovo
 Usishchevo
 Vaneyevo
 Vangino
 Vaskovo
 Vasyukovo
 Velikaya
 Velyamikovo
 Veretye
 Verhny Angoboy
 Verkh
 Veshnyaki
 Vichelovo
 Viterzhevo
 Vladimirovka
 Volkovo
 Voronino
 Vorontsovo
 Vorotynya
 Voshchazhnikovo
 Voynovo
 Yaganovo
 Yagnitsa
 Yagodnaya
 Yakonskoye
 Yakovlevo
 Yartsevo
 Yashnevo
 Yasnaya Polyana
 Yekimovo
 Yelekhovo
 Yelninskoye
 Yeltukhovo
 Yelyakhino
 Yenyukovo
 Yeremeyevo
 Yershovo
 Yevrasovo
 Yugi
 Yuryevets
 Zadniye Chudi
 Zakukoboy
 Zaosechye
 Zaruchevye
 Zavidovo
 Zayakoshye
 Zharki
 Zhavoronkovo
 Zhdanovskaya
 Zolotilovo

Gryazovetsky District 
Rural localities in Gryazovetsky District:

 18 km
 Abanino
 Agrafenka
 Akinfovitsa
 Aleksino
 Anankino
 Andrakovo
 Anninskoye
 Anokhino
 Anopino
 Anosovo
 Antipino
 Arefino
 Arkatovo
 Arsenka
 Artemovo
 Baksheyka
 Bakshino
 Balagurovo
 Barskoye
 Barskoye-Syrishchevo
 Basarigino
 Batovo
 Bekrenevo
 Bel
 Belovo
 Blazny
 Bogdanovo
 Bokotovo
 Bolshiye Dvorishcha
 Bolshoy Dor
 Bolshoye Brodino
 Bolshoye Denisyevo
 Bolshoye Kosikovo
 Bolshoye Kostino
 Bolshoye Zaymishche
 Bubeykino
 Burtsevo
 Bushuikha
 Bushuikha
 Chagrino
 Chernava
 Chernetskoye
 Chernitsyno
 Chernogubovo
 Chistopyanovo
 Chukharitsa
 Chuprovo
 Chuvaksino
 Demyankovo
 Demyanovo
 Devyat Izb
 Dikarevo
 Dolotovo
 Dresvishche
 Dubovka
 Dudenevo
 Dvorets
 Dyadinskoye
 Dyakonovo
 Dyakovo
 Dyukosovo
 Fedorkovo
 Fedyaykino
 Fetinino
 Filippovo
 Fomskoye
 Frol
 Galkino
 Gari
 Gavrakovo
 Gerasimovo
 Golubkovo
 Gora
 Goritsy
 Gorka
 Ileykino
 Ilyinskoye
 Isady
 Isakovo
 Ivnyak
 Ivonino
 Iyevlevo
 Kalinkino
 Kameshnik
 Kanevo
 Kargino
 Kashino
 Kastikha
 Kelyino
 Khaymino
 Khlebnikovo
 Khlyzino
 Khoroshevo
 Khudynino
 Khvastovo
 Kirpichnoye
 Kirpichny Zavod
 Kiselevo
 Klikunovo
 Klimkovo
 Klobukino
 Knyazevo
 Kobyakovo
 Kolotilikha
 Konstantinovo
 Korbino
 Kornilyevo
 Kornilyevskaya Sloboda
 Korotygino
 Koryuchevo
 Kosarovo
 Koshkino
 Kostino
 Krasnoye
 Krestovka
 Krivodino
 Krutets
 Kuksimovo
 Kurapovo
 Kurochkino
 Kuzemkino
 Lezha
 Loginovo
 Lomok
 Lukyanovo
 Lupochino
 Lyabzunka
 Maklakovo
 Maksimovitsa
 Markashovo
 Martyakovo
 Martynovo
 Mikhalevo
 Mikhalkovo
 Minkino
 Mishutino
 Mokeyevo
 Mukhino
 Munikovo
 Muravyovo
 Myasnikovka
 Myasnikovo
 Nadorozhny Lipovik
 Nazarka
 Nekhotovo
 Neklyudovo
 Nikola-Penye
 Nikulkino
 Nikultsevo
 Nizhnyaya Pustyn
 Nizovka
 Novoye
 Novoye-na-Lukhte
 Novy Dor
 Oberikha
 Obnorskaya Sloboda
 Obraztsovo
 Obukhovo
 Okhlyuyevo
 Ostanino
 Ovinishcha
 Palkino
 Paltsevo
 Panfilovo
 Pankratovo
 Panovo
 Parshino
 Pavlovskoye
 Peredkovo
 Pirogovo
 Piterimka
 Ploskoye
 Plyushchevo
 Podberezhsky
 Podkamenka
 Pogiblovo
 Polovoz
 Poltinino
 Polukhino
 Polushkino
 Popovkino
 Popovo
 Posyolok Lnozavoda
 Prokopyevo
 Putilovo
 Puzovo
 Ragozino
 Rakovo
 Ramenye
 Remennikovo
 Rodionovo
 Rostilovo
 Ryabinovka
 Rzhishcha
 Savkino
 Sementsevo
 Semeykino
 Senga
 Serezhino
 Shaldanovo
 Shemeykino
 Shepyakovo
 Shevyakovo
 Shilmyashevo
 Shirakovo
 Shnyakino
 Shushukovo
 Sidorovo
 Sidorovskoye
 Silifonovo
 Sitnikovo
 Skalino
 Skalino
 Slobodishcha
 Sopelkino
 Spas-Nurma
 Spasskoye
 Stanovishchevo
 Stary Dor
 Stepanovo
 Stepkovo
 Stepurino
 Stroyevo
 Studenets
 Suvorkovo
 Suvorovo
 Svinino
 Svistunovo
 Sychevo
 Tarasovo
 Tarshino
 Telebino
 Tretnikovo
 Troitskoye
 Tselennikovo
 Tsepelka
 Tufanovo
 Tufanovo
 Uglentsevo
 Ulyanovka
 Vaganovo
 Vanchino
 Varaksino
 Vasilevo
 Vasilyevka
 Vasyukovo
 Vederkovo
 Velikoretsky Lipovik
 Verkhnyaya Pustyn
 Vislyakovo
 Vokhtoga
 Volnoye-Syrishchevo
 Volotskoy
 Volynevo
 Voronino
 Voskresenskoye
 Vostorgsky
 Vosya
 Vosya
 Vozdvizhenskoye
 Voznesenye
 Vyborovo
 Vysokovo
 Yelkhovka
 Yelnik
 Yermolino
 Yesyutkino
 Yevdokimovo
 Yevsyukovo
 Yudino
 Yunosheskoye
 Yurovo
 Zadorka
 Zakharovo
 Zasechnoye
 Zayemye
 Zazholka
 Zhelominino
 Zhernokovo
 Zimnyak
 Zvyaglovka

Kaduysky District 
Rural localities in Kaduysky District:

 Abakanovo
 Aksentyevskaya
 Alekanovo
 Alenkino
 Alyavino
 Andronovo
 Annenskaya
 Baranovskaya
 Berezhok
 Bilkovo
 Bolshaya Gorka
 Bolshaya Rukavitskaya
 Bolshoy Smerdyach
 Bor
 Borisovo
 Boylovo
 Bryukhovo
 Budimorovo
 Buzykino
 Cherepanovo
 Chudinovo
 Chuprino
 Churovo
 Danilkovo
 Dedovets
 Dilskiye
 Dubrovnoye
 Dyomshino
 Fadeyevo
 Falenskaya
 Fanerny Zavod
 Filino
 Grigorovo
 Ilemnoye
 Ishkoboy
 Ivachevo
 Ivanovo
 Ivanovskoye
 Izorkovo
 Kaduy
 Kalinnikovo
 Kananyevskaya
 Kapchino
 Khlamovo
 Kholmishche
 Koposovo
 Korotnevaya
 Kovalyovo
 Krasnaya Zarya
 Krestovaya
 Krugloye
 Kryltsovo
 Kulikovo
 Kurakino
 Kuzminka
 Larionovskaya
 Lebenets
 Lepilovo
 Log
 Lukyanovo
 Lykovskaya
 Maksinskaya
 Malafeyevo
 Malaya Gorka
 Malaya Rukavitskaya
 Malaya Stupolokhta
 Maly Smerdyach
 Malyshevo
 Markovskaya
 Marlykovo
 Martyukhino
 Marygino
 Maza
 Melekhino
 Melentyevo
 Mikhalevo
 Mikhaylovskaya
 Moshnitskoye
 Myza
 Nikolskoye
 Nikonovskaya
 Niz
 Nizhniye
 Nizhniye
 Nizhny Pochinok
 Novinka
 Novoye
 Oseka
 Panyukovo
 Pelemen
 Ploskoye
 Porog
 Posobkovo
 Postnikovo
 Preobrazhenskaya
 Pryagayevo
 Pryamikovo
 Pugino
 Rykanets
 Safonovo
 Savelyevskaya
 Selishche
 Seltso-Rodnoye
 Seninskaya
 Shigodskiye
 Shiryevo
 Shoborovo
 Sloboda
 Smeshkovo
 Solokhta
 Sosnovka
 Spirenskaya
 Spiryutino
 Sredny Dvor
 Srednyaya Stupolokhta
 Stan
 Starostino
 Starukhi
 Strelkovo
 Sudakovo
 Syobra
 Timokhino
 Tomasha
 Tsipelevo
 Turpal
 Uspenskoye
 Ust-Kolp
 Vakhonkino
 Vasilyevskaya
 Velikoye
 Veliky Dvor
 Verkhny Dvor
 Verkhovye
 Vershina
 Vertyagino
 Volotskaya
 Voron
 Yakimovo
 Yakshinskaya
 Yamyshevo
 Yaryshevo
 Yazvitsevo
 Yeremeyevo
 Zadnyaya Stupolokhta
 Zaerap
 Zakazarye
 Zanino
 Zaozerye
 Zaruchevye
 Zavod
 Zayatskoye
 Zhidelevo
 Zhornovets
 Zhukov Pochinok
 Zykovo

Kharovsky District 
Rural localities in Kharovsky District:

 17 km
 6 km
 Afoninskaya
 Andreyevskaya
 Anfalikha
 Arzubikha
 Aseikha
 Balukovskaya
 Baranikha
 Bashmanovo
 Belenitsyno
 Belyayevskaya
 Berezhok
 Bilgachevo
 Bilskaya
 Bolshaya Serednyaya
 Bor
 Borisovskaya
 Borovikovo
 Budrikha
 Bugra
 Burchevskaya
 Bychikha
 Bykovo
 Cheremukhovo
 Chernukhino
 Chichirikha
 Churilovo
 Denisovskaya
 Derevenka Kuznechikha
 Derevenka Shapshinskaya
 Derevenka
 Derevyagino
 Deshinskoye
 Ditinskaya
 Dmitriyevo
 Dolgishchevo
 Dolgoborodovo
 Dorogushikha
 Dresvyanka
 Drobinino
 Druzhinino
 Durovskaya
 Dyagilevo
 Dyakovskaya
 Fedorovskoye
 Filinskoye
 Filippovo
 Fominskoye
 Glazikha
 Gorbatikha
 Gorka Kizimskaya
 Gorka Podselnaya
 Gorokhovka
 Gostinskaya
 Grechutino
 Gribtsovskaya
 Grishino
 Grudinskaya
 Ilyinskaya Popovka
 Ishenino
 Istomikha
 Ivachino
 Ivachinskaya
 Ivanikovo
 Ivashevo
 Karpovskoye
 Khalchikha
 Kharenskoye
 Kharitonikha
 Khomok
 Khomutovo
 Kiyevskaya
 Klepestikha
 Knyazhaya
 Kogarikha
 Konantsevo
 Konechnaya
 Konevo
 Korovikha
 Korovinskaya
 Kosarikha
 Kostino
 Kozhinskaya
 Kozlikha
 Kozlovo
 Krasimikha
 Krutets
 Kryukovo
 Kryukovskaya
 Kudryavtsevo
 Kuleshikha
 Kumzero
 Kunitsyno
 Kupaikha
 Kuryanovskaya
 Kuzminskoye
 Kuznechikha
 Kuznetsovskaya
 Kuzovlevo
 Kvashnikha
 Lapikha
 Larionikha
 Lavrikha
 Lebezh
 Lekalikha
 Leshyovo
 Leunikha
 Lisino
 Lobanikha
 Loginovskaya
 Loshchinikha
 Lukino
 Lukinskaya
 Lysovskaya
 Makarovskaya
 Malaya Serednyaya
 Mankovo
 Martynovskoye
 Maslovskaya
 Matveikha-Ramenskaya
 Maximikha
 Melentyevskaya
 Mezhdurechye
 Mezhurki
 Mikhalevo
 Mikhaylovskoye
 Mishakovo
 Mishkovskoye
 Mitikha
 Mogilenskaya
 Mokeyevskaya
 Muryginskaya
 Nasonovo
 Nazarikha
 Nelyubovskaya
 Nikulinskoye
 Nizhne-Kubensky
 Obrochnaya
 Obrochnoye
 Odenyevskaya
 Oleshkovo
 Osipikha
 Ostretsovskaya
 Palkinskaya
 Palkovskaya
 Paninskaya
 Pankovskaya
 Panovskoye
 Pashinskaya
 Pashuchikha
 Paunikha
 Pekhtikha
 Pereks
 Perepechino
 Pichikha
 Pikhtinskaya
 Pleshavka
 Plesnikha
 Plyasovo
 Podosharikha
 Pogost Nikolsky
 Polutikha
 Popchikha
 Popovka
 Poshivchikha
 Pronikha
 Punduga
 Ratnovskaya
 Sablukovo
 Samsonikha
 Savinskaya
 Savkovskaya
 Semenikha
 Semigorodnyaya
 Sergeikha
 Sergeyevskaya
 Sergozero
 Shapsha
 Shchukinskaya
 Shemyakino
 Shenurovo
 Shikhanikha
 Shilykovo
 Shutovo
 Sibla
 Simanikha
 Sinyakovo
 Sitinsky
 Slobodka
 Sokolovskaya
 Sopyatino
 Sorozhino
 Sosnovka
 Sotonikha
 Spasskaya
 Spichikha
 Stegaikha
 Sudovo
 Sychevo
 Sysoikha
 Tereshikha
 Tikhonino
 Tokarevo
 Tomashka
 Tsarikha
 Tsiposhevskaya
 Tyushkovskaya
 Ugol
 Ugolskaya
 Ulasovskaya
 Ustrechnaya
 Vakhrunikha
 Varlamovo
 Vatalovo
 Vaulikha
 Veliky Dvor
 Volchikha
 Volonga
 Voronino
 Vozrozhdeniye
 Yakushevo
 Yaskino
 Yekimovskaya
 Yerofeyevskaya
 Yesipovskaya
 Yudinskaya
 Yurtinskaya
 Zakharikha
 Zakharovskoye
 Zalesnaya
 Zarodikha
 Zarubino
 Zasukhino
 Zherlichikha
 Zhukovskaya
 Zimnitsa
 Zolotava
 Zolotogorka
 Zuyena

Kichmengsko-Gorodetsky District 
Rural localities in Kichmengsko-Gorodetsky District:

 Akimovo
 Aksyonovshchina
 Alferovo
 Ananino
 Antsiferovo Ramenye
 Artemyevskaya
 Baklanikha
 Baklanovskaya Melnitsa
 Baksheyev Dor
 Baranovo
 Barbolino
 Berezovaya Gora
 Berlikovo
 Bersenevo
 Bolshaya Chiryadka
 Bolshoye Barakovo
 Bolshoye Baykalovo
 Bolshoye Burtanovo
 Bolshoye Chekavino
 Bolshoye Khavino
 Bolshoye Lapino
 Bolshoye Lubozino
 Bolshoye Pozharovo
 Bolshoye Sirino
 Bolshoye Skretneye Ramenye
 Bryukhavitsa
 Burkovshchina
 Buryakovo
 Byakovo
 Cheshkovshchina
 Chupovo
 Chyornaya
 Danilovo
 Danilovskaya
 Demino
 Dolmatovo
 Dorozhkovo
 Fedyuninskaya
 Fominsky
 Gar
 Garazhi
 Goluzino
 Gora
 Gorbovo
 Gorka
 Gorodishche
 Gromozovo
 Isady
 Kalinino
 Karyug
 Kazarino
 Kholka
 Kichmenga
 Kichmengsky Gorodok
 Kirkino
 Klepikovo
 Klimovo
 Klyukino
 Knyazhigora
 Kobylkino
 Kobylsk
 Kolotovshchina
 Kondratovo
 Konets
 Konishchevo
 Kontiyevo
 Korkin Dor
 Koryakovskaya
 Koskovo
 Koskovo
 Kostylevo
 Kotelnovo
 Kradikhino
 Kradikhino
 Krasavino-2
 Krasnaya Gora
 Krasnoye Selo
 Krokhalevo
 Kryazh
 Kuftino
 Kuzmino
 Kuzminskaya
 Laptyug
 Laskino
 Lavrovo
 Leontyevshchina
 Leshukovshchina
 Lobanovo
 Lupachevo
 Lychenitsa
 Makarovo
 Malaya Chiryadka
 Malinovitsa
 Maloye Barakovo
 Maloye Lapino
 Maloye Pozharovo
 Maloye Ramenye
 Maloye Sirino
 Maly Dor
 Manshino
 Mariyevsky Vyselok
 Martynovo
 Matasovo
 Matino
 Maximovshchina
 Mikheyevo
 Mitenyova Gora
 Mokrushino
 Myakinnaya
 Myslikovo
 Nabolotnaya Gar
 Nadeyevshchina
 Nedubrovo
 Nekipelovo
 Niva
 Nizhneye Isakovo
 Nizhneye Nikitino
 Nizhneye Sergeyevo
 Nizhneye Vorovo
 Nizhny Yenangsk
 Nizhnyaya Lukina Gora
 Nizhnyaya Yentala
 Novaya Shilovshchina
 Novo-Georgiyevskoye
 Obakino
 Ogryzkovo
 Okinin Dor
 Okulovo
 Olenevo
 Olyatovo
 Olyushino
 Omut
 Osatovo-Ramenye
 Ovsyannikovo
 Paderino
 Pakhomovo
 Palutino
 Panovo
 Pavlovskaya
 Pelyaginets
 Petrakovo
 Petryanino
 Ploskaya
 Plostiyevo
 Podgorka
 Podgorye
 Podgorye
 Podgrivye
 Podlesovo
 Pogudino
 Polovishchensky
 Pomelovka
 Popovo
 Poryadnevshchina
 Priluk
 Prilukovo
 Pronino
 Puzovo
 Ramenye
 Reshetnikovo
 Rossoulinskaya
 Rudnikovo
 Ryabevo
 Ryabinovshchina
 Rybino
 Ryzhunikhino
 Samylovo
 Sarayevo
 Sarmas
 Savino
 Selishche
 Selivanovo
 Sementsev Dor
 Sergeyevo
 Sever
 Shartanovo
 Shatenevo
 Shchepelino
 Shelomets
 Shemyachkino
 Shestakovo
 Shilovo
 Shiryayevo
 Shonga
 Sigovo
 Sirino
 Sivtsevo
 Skoryukovo
 Sloboda
 Slobodka
 Smolyanka
 Solonikhino
 Sorokino
 Spirovskaya
 Spitsyno
 Staraya Shilovshchina
 Stepurino
 Sudnicheskaya Gora
 Sushniki
 Svetitsa
 Sychikha
 Taftinsky Navolok
 Tarasovo
 Tasherikha
 Tatarinovo
 Terekhino
 Titovshchina
 Tokarevo
 Toropovo
 Trubovshchina
 Trufanovo
 Ushakovo
 Ust-Syamzhenets
 Ustye Kharyuzovo
 Ustyenskaya
 Vaganovo
 Vasino
 Velikusha
 Verkhnesavinskaya
 Verkhneye Isakovo
 Verkhny Yenangsk
 Verkhnyaya Lukina Gora
 Verkhnyaya Yentala
 Volkovo
 Voronino
 Voroninskaya
 Vymol
 Vysokaya
 Yakshinskaya
 Yefimovo
 Yelovino
 Yemelyanov Dor
 Yermakova Gar
 Yugsky
 Zabolotny
 Zagarye
 Zakharovo
 Zamostovitsa
 Zarechye
 Zasorino
 Zasosenye
 Zavachug
 Zayuzhye
 Zharovikha
 Zhevnino
 Zhukovo
 Zvezda

Kirillovsky District 
Rural localities in Kirillovsky District:

 Argunovo
 Bolshoye Dityatevo
 Bolshoye Korovino
 Bolshoye Osanovo
 Bolshoye Zakozye
 Bragino
 Burakovo
 Chebunino
 Chevaksino
 Chirkovo
 Chishchino
 Dorogusha
 Dulovo
 Duravino
 Dyunevo
 Fedyayevo
 Ferapontovo
 Filimonovo
 Gromovo
 Gromukha
 Istominskaya
 Khmelevitsy
 Kishemskoye
 Klemushino
 Kochevino
 Kokovanovskaya
 Konyutino
 Koryakino
 Koshcheyevo
 Kukontsy
 Maly Dor
 Matveyevskoye
 Melekhovo
 Minchakovo
 Novodevichye
 Novshino
 Ostretsovo
 Paunino
 Pustyn
 Rogalevo
 Rozhevo
 Rukino
 Savinskoye
 Sazonovo
 Shchanikovo
 Shortino
 Sitkovo
 Sitskoye
 Skokovo
 Slavyanka
 Sobolevo
 Sopigino
 Starodevichye
 Strakhovo
 Tatyanino
 Terekhovskaya
 Tikhonovo
 Toloknyanitsa
 Ust-Sitskoye
 Vasilyevo
 Vymetnoye
 Zapan-Nova
 Zhilino

Mezhdurechensky District 
Rural localities in Mezhdurechensky District:

 Akulovskoye
 Alexandrovka
 Alexeyevo
 Artemyevo
 Bolshoye Makarovo
 Borshchevka
 Brunchakovo
 Bukino
 Dachnoye
 Dorovatka
 Dvinitsa
 Dyakonovo
 Egorye
 Fedoteyevo
 Frolovo
 Gavrilkovo
 Golubi
 Grekhnevka
 Igumnitsevo
 Ishkovo
 Ivankovo
 Kadasovo
 Kalitino
 Karpovo
 Karpovskoye
 Khozhayevo
 Kopylovo
 Kosmovo
 Kosovo
 Kotsyno
 Kozhukhovo
 Krapivino
 Krasotinka
 Kuzminskoye
 Lavrentyevo
 Lyskovo
 Makarovo
 Malaya Storona
 Maloye Makarovo
 Markovo
 Markvoskoye
 Matveytsevo
 Matyushkino
 Mikhalevo
 Motyri
 Mytnitsa
 Namestovo
 Nikolskoye
 Nizhny Pochinok
 Novaya
 Novosyolka
 Novoye
 Nozemskiye Isady
 Obroshino
 Odomtsyno
 Ognevo
 Olekhovo
 Ostretsovo
 Pankovo
 Parfenka
 Pazukhino
 Penyevo
 Peshkovo
 Pestikovo
 Petrishchevo
 Plemyannikovo
 Plyusnino
 Podbereznovo
 Podgornovo
 Podkurnovo
 Poplevino
 Popovskoye
 Pristan Isady
 Protasovo
 Pustoshnovo
 Razdolnaya
 Ropotovo
 Ryapalovo
 Sarantsyno
 Sbrodovo
 Selishcha
 Serednevo
 Shchipino
 Shchyolkovo
 Shetenevo
 Sheybukhta
 Shichenga
 Shikhmino
 Shikhovo
 Shingarskoye Isady
 Shonorovo
 Shuyskoye
 Slobodka
 Sovka
 Spas-Yamshchiki
 Staroye
 Stepanovskoye
 Svatilovo
 Svyatogorye
 Tupitsyno
 Turovets
 Turybanino
 Ushakovo
 Uvarovitsa
 Vaskino
 Voltash
 Vorobeytsevo
 Vragovo
 Vysokovo
 Yaskino
 Yekimovo
 Yershovo
 Yusovo
 Zarechye
 Zhidovinovo
 Zmeytsyno
 Znamenskoye

Nikolsky District 
Rural localities in Nikolsky District:

 Abaturovo
 Aksentyevo
 Argunovo
 Baydarovo
 Belyayevka
 Bludnovo
 Bogdanovka
 Bolshoy Dvor
 Bolshoye Fomino
 Bolshoye Oksilovo
 Bolshoye Sverchkovo
 Borok
 Brodovitsa
 Burakovo
 Butova Kurya
 Chegodayevsky
 Chelpanovo
 Chernino
 Cherntsovo
 Chushevino
 Chyornaya
 Demino
 Dor
 Dunilovo
 Dunilovsky
 Dvorishche
 Dyachkovo
 Filimonovy Gari
 Filinsky
 Filippovo
 Gagarin
 Gora
 Gorka-Kokuy
 Gorokhovsky
 Guzhovo
 Ilyinskoye
 Irdanovo
 Ivakovo
 Ivantets
 Kachug
 Kalauz
 Kalinino
 Kamennoye
 Kamenny
 Karnysh
 Kholshevikovo
 Kipshenga
 Klenovaya
 Knyazhevo
 Kolesov Log
 Konygino
 Korepino
 Koshelevo
 Kostenevo
 Kostylevo
 Kotelnoye
 Kovrigino
 Kovyrtsevo
 Kozhayevo
 Kozlovka
 Krasnaya Zvezda
 Krasnoye Zvedeniye
 Krivodeyevo
 Krivyatskoye
 Kudanga
 Kudangsky
 Kudrino
 Kumbiser
 Kurevino
 Kuznechikha
 Kuznetsovo
 Lantyug
 Lashovo
 Leunino
 Levkin
 Levoberezhny
 Lipovo
 Lisitsyno
 Lokha
 Lyulkovo
 Makarovsky
 Maloye Fomino
 Maloye Oksilovo
 Maloye Sverchkovo
 Malyye Gari
 Markovo
 Melentyevo
 Michkovo
 Milofanovo
 Mokretsevo
 Molodyozhny
 Myakishevo
 Nagavitsino
 Nigino
 Nizhny Rystyug
 Noskovo
 Nyunenga
 Orlovo
 Osinovaya Gar
 Osinovo
 Paderino
 Pakhomovo
 Panteleyevo
 Pavlovo
 Perebor
 Permas
 Permassky
 Pertyug
 Petryanino
 Petryayevo
 Pezhenga
 Pichug
 Plaksino
 Podgorye
 Podol
 Podolskaya
 Podosinovets
 Pogorelitsa
 Polezhayevo
 Polovina
 Polovinka
 Prudishnaya
 Putilovo
 Pyatakov
 Rameshki
 Rodyukino
 Rokunovo
 Samylovo
 Selivanovo
 Semenka
 Senino
 Serpovo
 Shalashnevo
 Sharzhenga
 Shiri
 Shirokaya
 Sinitsyno
 Skomoroshye
 Sluda
 Sofronovo
 Sokolovo
 Solotnovo
 Sorokino
 Starina
 Stepshinsky
 Storozhevaya
 Subornaya
 Svetly Klyuch
 Syrkovo
 Talitsa
 Tarasovo
 Telyanino
 Terebayevo
 Tokovitsa
 Travino
 Turino
 Upiralovo
 Uritskoye
 Vakhnevo
 Verkhny Rystyug
 Verkhnyaya Kema
 Verkhovino
 Vesyolaya Griva
 Vinograd
 Vladimirovo
 Vsemirskaya
 Vyrypayevo
 Vysokinsky
 Yamskaya
 Yelkhovetsky
 Yelkhovka
 Yeremkin
 Yermakovo
 Yesipovo
 Yushkovo
 Zavarikha
 Zavrazhye
 Zaymishche
 Zelentsovo
 Zelyonaya Griva
 Zemtsovo
 Zhivotovo

Nyuksensky District 
Rural localities in Nyuksensky District:

 Ananyevskaya
 Berezovaya Slobodka
 Berezovo
 Bobrovskoye
 Bolshaya Gorka
 Bolshaya Selmenga
 Bolshiye Ivki
 Bor
 Brusenets
 Brusnovolovsky Pogost
 Bryzgalovo
 Bykovo
 Dunay
 Dvorishche
 Fedkovskaya
 Gora
 Gorodishchna
 Igmas
 Ivanovskaya
 Karmanov Dvor
 Kazakovo
 Khokhlovo
 Kileynaya Vystavka
 Kirillovo
 Klimshino
 Kokshenskaya
 Kokuyevo
 Kopylovo
 Korolevskaya
 Kosmarevskaya Kuliga
 Kozlevskaya
 Kozlovo
 Krasavino
 Kuznetsovskaya
 Larinskaya
 Lesyutino
 Levash
 Lopatino
 Lukino
 Lyamenskaya
 Makarino
 Malaya Gorka
 Malaya Selmenga
 Malchevskaya
 Malye Ivki
 Martynovskaya
 Matveyevo
 Matveyevskaya
 Monastyrikha
 Mygra
 Nakvasino
 Nizhneye Kamennoye
 Nizhnyaya Gorka
 Nizovki
 Norovo
 Nyuksenitsa
 Oleshkovka
 Opalikhi
 Panfilikha
 Perkhushkovo
 Peski
 Poboishchnoye
 Prozhektor
 Pustynya
 Razulichye
 Sarafanovskaya
 Semenova Gora
 Shulgino
 Slekishino
 Sloboda
 Slobodka
 Sofronovskaya
 Sovetskaya
 Strelka
 Ustye-Gorodishchenskoye
 Veliky Dvor
 Verkhneye Kamennoye
 Verkhnyaya Gorka
 Verkhovye
 Vostroye
 Zaborye
 Zadny Dvor
 Zaglubotskaya
 Zarechye
 Zhar
 Zimnyak
 Zveglivets

Sheksninsky District 
Rural localities in Sheksninsky District:

 Afanasovo
 Alexeyevo
 Alferovo
 Andreykovo
 Andryushino
 Anisimovo
 Ankimarovo
 Antipino
 Aristovo
 Artemyevo
 Bekarevo
 Beloye
 Beregovoy
 Bereznik
 Biryuchevo
 Bolshaya Mushnya
 Bolshaya Stepanovskaya
 Bolshoy Ovinets
 Bolshoye Ivanovskoye
 Bolshoye Mitenino
 Bolshoye Pankino
 Boryatino
 Boyarovo
 Bratkovo
 Bratovets
 Bronnikovo
 Brykino
 Bugry
 Bulatovo
 Burakovo
 Bylino
 Chagino
 Charomskoye
 Cherneyevo
 Chetverikovo
 Churilovo
 Churovskoye
 Davydkovo
 Davydovo
 Demenskoye
 Demidovo
 Demino
 Demsino
 Deryagino
 Dobrets
 Domshino
 Dubki
 Dudkino
 Dumino
 Durasovo
 Dyakonitsa
 Dyakonovskoye
 Fedorovo
 Fedotovo
 Filyakovo
 Florida
 Fonino
 Gavrilovo
 Gerasimovo
 Globena
 Glupovskoye
 Glyadkovo
 Gologuzka
 Gorodskoye
 Gorokhovskoye
 Gramotino
 Grigoryevskoye
 Gubino
 Gushchino
 Gvozdevo
 Ignatovskoye
 Igumnovo
 Irma
 Ivankovo
 Kalikino
 Kameshnik
 Kameshnitsa
 Kapustino
 Katayevo
 Kelbuy
 Khanevo
 Khodyrevo
 Khoroshevo
 Kichino
 Kirgody
 Kiselevo
 Knyazhe
 Kochino
 Koluberevo
 Komarovo
 Konshevo
 Koposikha
 Kopylovo
 Korotkovo
 Koryakino
 Koshcheyevo
 Kostinskoye
 Kotovo
 Kovshovo
 Kozhevnikovo
 Krasnoye
 Krasny Kholm
 Krenevo
 Kukino
 Kulpino
 Kurovo
 Kurya
 Kuryakovo
 Kvasyunino
 Larionovo
 Leonovo
 Leushkino
 Levinskaya
 Lgovo
 Loginovo
 Lukinki
 Lupanda
 Lyskovo
 Lyubomirovo
 Lyutchik
 Machevo
 Makaryino
 Malaya Mushnya
 Malinukha
 Maloye Pankino
 Maly Ovinets
 Malyino
 Matveyevskoye
 Maurino
 Maximkovo
 Maximovskoye
 Medvezhye
 Mikhaylovskoye
 Mineyka
 Mironkovo
 Mititsyno
 Mitkino
 Mitrokhovo
 Molodishchevo
 Molodki
 Mys
 Myshkino
 Nazarovo
 Nefedkovo
 Nesterovo
 Nikolskoye
 Nizhny Dor
 Nizhnyaya Gorka
 Nizkiye
 Nokshino
 Norovka
 Novo
 Novoselki
 Obukhovo
 Osyutino
 Pacha
 Pakhomovo
 Panfilovo
 Pankino
 Papushino
 Pashnets
 Pavlikovo
 Pavlovskoye
 Pegusha
 Perkhino
 Pervino
 Pleshchakovo
 Poddubye
 Podgorny
 Podolets
 Polezhayevo
 Polyana
 Potanino
 Pozdeyevo
 Progress
 Prokino
 Pryadino
 Pustoshka
 Pyryayevo
 Pyzheyevo
 Ramenye
 Razbuy
 Rebyachyevo
 Rechnaya Sosnovka
 Roitsa
 Romannikovo
 Roshcha
 Rusanovo
 Rylovo
 Rzhanitsyno
 Saunino
 Seletskaya
 Seltsa
 Semkino
 Shapkino
 Shelomovo
 Shelukhino
 Shigoyevo
 Shipitsyno
 Skorynino
 Slavyanka
 Slizovo
 Sobolevo
 Sobolino
 Sokolye
 Sologost
 Solovarka
 Spitsy
 Starovo
 Staroye Selo
 Sukholomovo
 Suslovskoye
 Svatkovo
 Svetilovo
 Syamichi
 Syromyatkino
 Sızma
 Tarkanovo
 Telibanovo
 Timshino
 Tirkovo
 Tochka
 Troshino
 Turtsevo
 Tyapino
 Uloshkovo
 Ustyanovo
 Uvarovo
 Vakarino
 Vaneyevo
 Vasilyevo
 Vasilyevskoye
 Vaskovo
 Velikoye
 Velyushevo
 Verkhny Dor
 Vinogradovo
 Volkovo
 Vorkop
 Vorontsovo
 Voterka
 Yakunina Gora
 Yedoma
 Yefimovo
 Yekimovskoye
 Yeremino
 Yershovo
 Yurochkino
 Zadnyaya
 Zaozerye
 Zarechnoye
 Zhabino
 Zhayno
 Zolotukha
 Zverinets
 Zytsovo

Sokolsky District 
Rural localities in Sokolsky District:

 Agafonovo
 Alekino
 Aleksino
 Alexeyevo
 Alferovskoye
 Andreyevskoye
 Andronovo
 Antufyevo
 Arkhangelskoye
 Bakulino
 Barskoye
 Beketovo
 Bekrenevo
 Berezino
 Berezov Pochinok
 Berkovo
 Bessolovo
 Bilnovo
 Biryakovo
 Bolshiye Ivanovskiye
 Bolshiye Ozerki
 Bolshoy Krivets
 Bolshoye Petrakovo
 Bolshoye Yakovkovo
 Boriskovo
 Borisovo
 Borshchevo
 Borshchovka
 Boyarskoye
 Bratskoye
 Bryukhovo
 Burtsevo
 Chekshino
 Chepurovo
 Chuchkovo
 Derevenka
 Dmitrikovo
 Dyakovo
 Dyurbenikha
 Fedyayevo
 Fefilovo
 Filyayevo
 Frolovo
 Georgiyevskoye
 Gerasimovo
 Gladkino
 Glebovo
 Golodeyevo
 Gololitsyno
 Gorbovo
 Gribanovo
 Gribtsovo
 Guriyevo
 Istominskoye
 Ivanikha
 Ivankovo
 Ivanovo
 Ivkovo
 Kachalka
 Kalinovo
 Kalitino
 Kamskoye
 Kapustino
 Karpovskoye
 Kazarinovo
 Kazarnoye
 Kaznakuryevo
 Khaminovo
 Kharlushino
 Klokovo
 Knyazhevo
 Kolotovye
 Komarovo
 Konanikha
 Konanovo
 Koposikha
 Kopylovo
 Korino
 Korzha
 Kotlaksa
 Kozhukovo
 Kozlovo
 Krinkino
 Kromovesovo
 Kulseyevo
 Kurya
 Kuvayevo
 Kuvshinovo
 Kuzminskoye
 Lebechikha
 Lendobovo
 Levkovo
 Lipovitsa
 Litega
 Lodeyshchik
 Loginovo
 Lubodino
 Malakhovo
 Malaya Murga
 Maloye Petrakovo
 Maloye Zalesye
 Maly Krivets
 Malye Goritsy
 Malye Ivanovskiye
 Malye Ozerki
 Mamonkino
 Marfinskoye
 Markovskoye
 Medvedkovo
 Melenka
 Melino
 Mikheyevo
 Mishutkino
 Mortkino
 Morzhenga
 Myalitsyno
 Nadeyevo
 Naliskoye
 Naumovskoye
 Navalkino
 Nekrasovo
 Nelidovo
 Nesterovo
 Nikolskaya
 Nikolskoye
 Nikulinskoye
 Novy
 Obrosovo
 Ogarovo
 Okulikha
 Okulovskoye
 Olarevo
 Opalevo
 Osanovo
 Osipikha
 Osipovo
 Ostrilovo
 Ovsyannikovo
 Ozerko
 Pakhino
 Pakhtalka
 Panyutino
 Pashenino
 Pashikovo
 Pepelnikovo
 Perevoz
 Perkhurovo
 Petrovskoye
 Petryayevo
 Pirogovo
 Plishkino
 Podolnoye
 Podyelnoye
 Pogost Ilyinsky
 Popovo
 Preobrazhenskoye
 Prisedkino
 Prokopovo
 Prokshino
 Prudovka
 Pustoshka
 Pyatino
 Pykhmarevo
 Repnoye
 Rodionovo
 Rodyukino
 Rogozkino
 Rostovka
 Ryazanka
 Rykulya
 Rylovo
 Savkino
 Selishche
 Seltso
 Semakino
 Semenkovo
 Semenovo
 Senino
 Shachino
 Shadrino
 Shastovo
 Shastovo-Zabereznoye
 Shchekotovo
 Shchurikha
 Shera
 Shiblovka
 Shipunovo
 Shishkino
 Shitrobovo
 Shulepovo
 Sidorkovo
 Skomorokhovo
 Sloboda
 Slobodishchevo
 Sonikha
 Sosnovaya Roshcha
 Sosnovets
 Spitsyno
 Staroye
 Stepanovo
 Sudoverf
 Sverchkovo
 Tataurov Pochinok
 Telyachye
 Tenkovo
 Timoninskoye
 Titovskoye
 Tokhmarevo
 Tolstoumovo
 Treparevo
 Trukhinka
 Tupitsyno
 Turbayevo
 Tureyevo
 Turovo
 Tyrykovo
 Ugol
 Ugolskoye
 Varushino
 Vasilevo
 Vasilyevskoye
 Vaskovo
 Vasyutino
 Veretye
 Verkhnyaya Storona
 Vitoryevo
 Vlasovo
 Voksino
 Vorobyovo
 Vyazovoye
 Vysokaya
 Yadrovo
 Yakovlevo
 Yertebino
 Yesipovo
 Zabereznichye
 Zabolotka
 Zadneye
 Zakharovo
 Zakurskoye
 Zaledeyevo
 Zalesye
 Zamoshye
 Zavrazhye
 Zhikharevo
 Zhilino
 Zuyevo

Syamzhensky District 
Rural localities in Syamzhensky District:

 Alexeyevskaya
 Alferovskaya
 Anikovskaya
 Arganovo
 Artyomovskaya
 Averinskaya
 Babino
 Baranikha
 Borisovskaya
 Borok-1
 Borok-2
 Burdukovo
 Burnikha
 Chaglotovo
 Chertikha
 Chirkovskaya
 Chizhovo
 Davydkovo
 Davydovskaya
 Demidovskaya
 Druzhba
 Fedosikha
 Frolikha
 Georgiyevskaya
 Gerasimikha
 Goluzino
 Gremyachy
 Gridino
 Ignashevskaya
 Ikonnikovo
 Istominskaya
 Ivanovskaya
 Kharitonovskaya
 Kladovitsa
 Klepikovskaya
 Klimushino
 Klokovo
 Kocherzhikha
 Kolbinskaya
 Koltyrikha
 Kononovskaya
 Kopylovo
 Korostelevo
 Kubinskaya
 Kuryanovskaya
 Kuzminskaya
 Lelekovskaya
 Levinskaya
 Lukinskaya
 Lyubovitsa
 Malinnik
 Markovo
 Markovskaya
 Martyanikha
 Maryinskaya
 Mininskaya
 Mirny
 Mokrovo
 Monastyrskaya
 Myakotikha
 Nesterikha
 Nikolskoye
 Nikulinskaya
 Noginskaya
 Novaya Sluda
 Olekhovskaya
 Orlovskaya
 Peshkovskaya
 Pestino
 Pigilinskaya
 Piligino
 Pirogovo
 Podlesnaya
 Pogorelets
 Pogrebnoye
 Poluyanikha
 Ponomarikha
 Prozhektor
 Puronga
 Putkovo
 Ramenye
 Rassokhino
 Rechkovskaya
 Rogovitsynskaya
 Rubtsovo
 Samsonovskaya
 Savinskaya
 Semenikha
 Shestakovskaya
 Shirega
 Shishakovo
 Shoksha
 Shubachevo
 Sidorovo
 Sobolikha
 Srednyaya Sluda
 Staraya
 Syamzha
 Trubakovo
 Trusikha
 Ushakovskaya
 Ust-Reka
 Uzmitsa
 Vakhrushevskaya
 Veliky Dvor
 Volkhovskaya
 Voronovo
 Vydrikha
 Vysokovo
 Yakovlevskaya
 Yarygino
 Yermakovskaya
 Yeskino
 Yevsyutino
 Yezdunya
 Yukovskaya
 Zakharovskaya
 Zakostimye
 Zalesye
 Zaytsevo
 Zhar
 Zhityovo

Tarnogsky District 
Rural localities in Tarnogsky District:

 Abbakumovskaya
 Afonovskaya
 Agapitovskaya
 Aksyutinskaya
 Akulovskaya
 Ananikha
 Ananyevskaya
 Anikin Pochinok
 Anosovskaya
 Antropikha
 Antusheva Gora
 Ayga
 Bakrylovo
 Baranskaya
 Baryshevskaya
 Bashevskaya
 Belovskaya
 Belyayevskaya
 Bereznik
 Bobrovitsa
 Bolshaya Semyonovskaya
 Bolshaya Verkhotina
 Bolshoy Gorokh
 Borisovskaya
 Borok
 Boyarskaya
 Braginskaya
 Budrinskaya
 Budrinskaya-1
 Burmasovo
 Burtsevskaya
 Chalovskaya
 Chasovnoye
 Cherepanikha
 Cherniyevo
 Chernyakovo
 Chernyatinskaya
 Chernyshovo
 Chobotovo
 Churilovka
 Danilov Pochinok
 Davydikha
 Davydovskaya
 Dementyevskaya
 Demidovskaya
 Denisovskaya
 Deshevikha
 Desyatina
 Dmitriyevskaya
 Dor
 Doroninskaya
 Durnevskaya
 Fatyanovo
 Fednevskaya
 Fedorovskaya
 Feofilatovskaya
 Filimonovskaya
 Filyakovo
 Gagarikha
 Galitskaya
 Gavrilovskaya
 Gavshino
 Golchevskaya
 Golebatovo
 Gorka-2
 Goryayevskaya
 Gribovskaya
 Grigoryevskaya
 Gusikha
 Ignatikha
 Ignatovskaya
 Igumnovskaya
 Ikhomovo
 Ilezsky Pogost
 Ilyinskaya
 Ilyukhinskaya
 Isachkovo
 Isainskaya
 Isakovskaya
 Ivanovskaya
 Kalininskoye
 Kamchuga
 Kamchuga
 Kameshkurye
 Kanskoye
 Kapelino
 Kaplinskaya
 Karchevskaya
 Karelinskaya-2
 Karitsa
 Karpovskaya
 Kashinskoye
 Katerinino
 Kharitonovskaya
 Kholkin Konets
 Khom
 Kichiginskaya
 Kirivanovskaya
 Kiyanskaya
 Klenovaya
 Klevtsovskaya
 Klimovo
 Klyzhovo
 Knyazhaya
 Knyazhikha
 Kobylye
 Kochenga
 Kochurovo
 Kokorikha
 Komaritsa
 Kondratyevskaya
 Kon-Gora
 Kontorka
 Kontsevskaya
 Konyukhovskaya
 Korchazhinskaya
 Kormakino
 Korolikha
 Korotkovskaya
 Kostaikha
 Kovrizhinskaya
 Kozhevnikovskaya
 Kozhinskaya
 Krasnoye
 Krasny Bor
 Kremlevo
 Kriulya
 Krivosheinskaya
 Krotovskaya
 Krutaya Osyp
 Kurevino
 Kurkovskaya
 Kuryanikha
 Kuznecheyevskaya
 Kvashninskaya
 Lavy
 Lesnikovo
 Levinskoye
 Lodygino
 Lomovo
 Lukinskaya
 Lyapinskaya
 Lychnaya
 Lyginskaya
 Lyubavchikha
 Makaryino
 Maklinskaya
 Malakhovsky Bor
 Malaya Gora
 Malaya Popovskaya
 Malaya Semyonovskaya
 Malaya Verkhotina
 Malchevskaya
 Maloye Voronino
 Manylovitsa
 Manylovo
 Manylovsky Pogost
 Manyukovskaya
 Marachevskaya
 Martyanovskaya
 Maslikha
 Matveyevskaya
 Maurnikovskaya
 Maximovskaya
 Meleshovo
 Mesto Alexandrovo
 Mikhaylovka
 Mikhaylovskaya
 Mikheyevskaya
 Milogorskaya
 Mishukovo
 Mitinskaya
 Nefedikha
 Nefedovskaya
 Nefedyevo
 Neklyudikha
 Nelyubino
 Nesterikha
 Nikiforovskaya
 Nikitikha
 Nikitin Pochinok
 Nikolayevskaya
 Nikonovskaya
 Nizhnepauninskaya
 Nizhnyaya Pechenga
 Novgorodskaya
 Okatovskaya
 Okulovskaya
 Olikhovskaya
 Osilkovo
 Osovaya
 Ostankovo
 Ostashevskaya
 Ovsyannikovskaya
 Ozhiginskaya
 Pakhotino
 Pakhtusovo
 Pakutino
 Palkinskaya
 Panikha
 Par
 Patrakeyevskaya
 Pavlomatveyevskaya
 Pershinskaya
 Pershinskaya-1
 Pershinskaya-2
 Petrilovo
 Petrishcheva Gora
 Petryayevskaya
 Ploshilovskaya
 Podlipnoye
 Pogonyayevskaya
 Pogoreltsevo
 Pogost Luka
 Pogost
 Pomazikha
 Pominovskaya
 Porokhovo
 Pospelovskaya
 Posyolok Myasokombinata
 Potepalovo
 Pritykino
 Prokopyevskaya
 Pronevskaya
 Puzovka
 Pyatovskaya
 Radchino
 Ramenye
 Regishevskaya
 Rodnaya
 Romashevsky Pogost
 Rudino
 Rudnovskaya
 Ryazanka
 Rykalovskaya
 Rylkovskaya
 Samsonovskaya
 Savinskaya
 Semenovskaya
 Semerninskoye
 Semichayevskaya
 Senskaya
 Senyukovskaya
 Seredskaya
 Sergeyevskoye
 Sergiyevskaya
 Shelkovo
 Shelovskaya
 Shershukovskaya
 Shkulevskaya
 Shulevo
 Sinyakovo
 Sinyakovskaya
 Skoryatenskoye
 Slastnichikha
 Slobodinskaya
 Slobodka
 Sluda
 Sludka
 Smetanino
 Snezhurovo
 Spassky Pogost
 Spichenskaya
 Srodino
 Stafilovo
 Stary Dvor
 Stepushino
 Strukovo
 Sukhaya Veret
 Surovchikha
 Surovtsovo
 Sverchkovskaya
 Sverdlovskaya
 Tabory
 Tarasovskaya
 Tarnogsky Gorodok
 Tekstilshchiki
 Telpino
 Tikhonikha
 Timoshinskaya
 Tiunovskaya
 Toporikha
 Toropovskaya
 Tryznovo
 Tsaryova
 Tselkovskaya
 Tsybuninskaya
 Tyrlyninskaya
 Tyuprikha
 Tyurdinskaya
 Uglitskaya
 Ugryumovskaya
 Ukhtanga
 Ulyanovskaya
 Uspenye
 Ust-Tsareva
 Ust-Yedenga
 Uvarovskaya
 Vanevskaya
 Varnitsy
 Vasyutkino
 Vaulovo
 Velikaya
 Verigino
 Verkhnepauninskaya
 Verkhovny Pogost
 Vershininskaya
 Vidernikovskaya
 Volodinskaya
 Vorlygino
 Voroninskaya
 Vorotishna
 Voshchar
 Vyazutinskaya
 Vydrino
 Yafanovskaya
 Yakinskaya
 Yakunikha
 Yakurino
 Yakushevskaya
 Yarinskaya
 Yarygino
 Yedovinskaya
 Yefimovskaya
 Yekimikha
 Yelifanovskaya Vystavka
 Yelifanovskaya
 Yeltsino
 Yemelyanovskaya
 Yepifanovskaya
 Yerino
 Yermakovskaya
 Yermolinskaya
 Yermolitsa
 Yevseyevskaya
 Yezovo
 Yugra
 Yurenino
 Zapolnaya
 Zubarevo
 Zuikha
 Zykov Konets

Totemsky District 
Rural localities in Totemsky District:

 Antushevo
 Berezhok
 Bor
 Bykovo
 Cherepanikha
 Chernyakovo
 Davydkovo
 Dor
 Dyagilevo
 Fedotovo
 Filino
 Fominskaya
 Fominskoye
 Frolovo
 Glubokoye
 Gremyachy
 Ignachevo
 Ivakino
 Ivanovskaya
 Klimovskaya
 Korovinskaya
 Kotelnoye
 Kozlovka
 Krasnoye
 Kudrinskaya
 Kuzemkino
 Lenino
 Levash
 Lobanikha
 Luchkino
 Lukinskaya
 Martynovskaya
 Matveyevo
 Medvedevo
 Molokovo
 Mys
 Nikitinskaya
 Nikolskoye
 Oktyabrsky
 Panovo
 Pavlovskaya
 Pelevikha
 Pervomaysky
 Petukhovo
 Pogorelovo
 Popovskaya
 Pustosh
 Pyatovskaya
 Savino
 Semenkovo
 Semyonovskaya
 Sergeyevo
 Shulgino
 Sloboda
 Sluda
 Sokolovo
 Sovetsky
 Svetitsa
 Ustye
 Voronino
 Yartsevo
 Yubileyny
 Zadnyaya
 Zhilino

Ust-Kubinsky District 
Rural localities in Ust-Kubinsky District:

 Afanasovskaya
 Alyunenskaya
 Ananyino
 Andreyevskaya
 Antsiferovskaya
 Aristovo
 Avdeyevo
 Berezhnoye
 Bogorodskoye
 Bogoslovo
 Boriskovo
 Burdukovo
 Chirkovo
 Davydovskaya
 Dor
 Fedorkovo
 Fedorovskaya
 Feninskaya
 Filenskoye
 Filisovo
 Goleninskaya
 Gora
 Grizino
 Ivanovskaya
 Karpovskoye
 Konanovo
 Kostinskaya
 Krylovo
 Kryukovo
 Kulakovo
 Kurkinskaya
 Kuzminskoye
 Lyskovskaya
 Maloye Lyskarevo
 Maslovo
 Mitenskoye
 Nikiforovskaya
 Nikola-Koren
 Nikolskoye
 Pavlovskoye
 Perkhuryevo
 Ploskovo
 Plyushchevo
 Podgorye
 Pogost Trifon
 Popovka
 Rodionovo
 Ryazanovo
 Semenovskoye
 Shabarovo
 Shadrino
 Shambovo
 Shikhovo
 Shpilikha
 Sidorovskaya
 Sidorovskoye
 Staroye
 Sverchkovo
 Syanino
 Tavlash
 Tulpanovo
 Ugol
 Ustye
 Vecheslovo
 Vlasyevo
 Volosovo
 Voronino
 Voronovo
 Vysokoye
 Yelizarovo
 Yukovo
 Zadneye
 Zaluzhye
 Zhdanovskaya

Ustyuzhensky District 
Rural localities in Ustyuzhensky District:

 Alekino
 Alexandrovo
 Alexandrovo-Maryino
 Alexeyevo
 Anashkino
 Andrakovo
 Antonovo
 Astashkino
 Balakhtimerovo
 Bernyakovo
 Boguslavl
 Bolshaya Lipenka
 Bolshoye Pomyasovo
 Bolshoye Vosnoye
 Borodino
 Borovinka
 Brenchikha
 Brilino
 Bronino
 Bugry
 Byvaltsevo
 Chesavino
 Chirets
 Chuprovo
 Chyornaya
 Danilovskoye
 Degtyarnya
 Dementyevo
 Demtsyno
 Denisovo
 Derevyaga
 Dolotskoye
 Dora
 Dorino
 Dubrovka
 Dyagilevo
 Fedorovskoye
 Ganki
 Gliny
 Glukhovo-1
 Glukhovo-2
 Gora
 Gorodok
 Gromoshikha
 Gryada
 Gryaznaya Dubrova
 Igumnovo
 Isakovo
 Ivanovskoye
 Izbishchi
 Khripelevo
 Kishkino
 Kononovo
 Konyukhovo
 Kormovesovo
 Korokolets
 Kortikha
 Kostyanovo
 Kotovo
 Kozlovo
 Krasino
 Kresttsy
 Kresty
 Krotyn
 Kruglitsy
 Krutets
 Kstovo
 Kurevanikha
 Kuzemino
 Kvashnino
 Legalovo
 Lentyevo
 Leushino
 Loginovo
 Lukhnevo
 Lukyantsevo
 Lychno
 Lyubotovo
 Malaya Dubrovochka
 Maloye Medvedevo
 Maloye Vosnoye
 Marfino
 Martynovo
 Matveyevo
 Maximovskoye
 Melechino
 Meryozha
 Mezga
 Mikhalyovo
 Mikhaylovskoye
 Mochala
 Modno
 Myza-Testovo
 Nechalovo
 Nikiforovo
 Nikola
 Novaya
 Novinki
 Novoye Ivantsevo
 Obukhovo
 Ogib
 Okulovo
 Oryol
 Osinovik
 Osnopolye
 Pergovishchi
 Perya
 Petrovo
 Plotichye
 Poddubye
 Podolskoye
 Ponizovye
 Popchikha
 Popovka
 Poroslovo
 Posyolok imeni Zhelyabova
 Pozharki
 Pozharovo
 Rastoropovo
 Remennikovo
 Rodishkino
 Romankovo
 Rozhnyovo
 Samoylovo
 Samsonovo
 Savino
 Selishche
 Seltso
 Shaloch
 Shelokhach
 Shubotovo
 Shuklino
 Shustovo
 Sidorovo
 Skoblevo
 Slavynevo
 Sludy
 Sobolevo
 Sofrontsevo
 Solnechny
 Solovtsovo
 Soshnevo
 Spasskoye
 Starorechye
 Staroye Kvasovo
 Staroye Maloye
 Stepachyovo
 Svistuny
 Sychevo
 Sysoyevo
 Temyanikovo
 Teplino
 Timofeyevskoye
 Timonino
 Torsheyevo
 Trestenka
 Tsampelovo
 Tyukhtovo
 Vanskoye
 Varlygino
 Venitsy
 Vetrennikovo
 Volosovo
 Voronino
 Voronovo
 Vorontsy
 Vorotishino
 Vozgrikha
 Vypolzovo
 Vysotino
 Yakovlevskoye
 Yemelyanikha
 Yubileyny
 Zagorye
 Zakharovskoye
 Zalesye
 Zavrazhye
 Zaytsevo
 Zhilino
 Zhukovo
 Zimnik
 Zvana
 Zyablikovo
 Zykovo

Vashkinsky District 
Rural localities in Vashkinsky District:

 Aksentyevo
 Aleshino
 Alferovskaya
 Andreyevskaya
 Anikovo
 Anshevskaya
 Antropovo
 Averino
 Bereg
 Bereznik
 Bolshaya Chagotma
 Bolshoy Dvor
 Bonga
 Borisovo
 Bosovo
 Chertezh
 Chesnokovo
 Chisti
 Dankino
 Danshin Ruchey
 Davydovo
 Demidovo
 Deryagino
 Domantovo
 Dryabloye
 Dudrovo
 Durasovo
 Filippovo
 Gavrilovo
 Gavrilovo-2
 Glukharevo
 Gora (Andreyevskoye Rural Settlement)
 Gora (Vasilyevskoye Rural Settlement)
 Ikonnikovo
 Istomino
 Ivanovskaya
 Iyevlevo
 Kalitino
 Kharbovo
 Kiuy
 Konechnaya
 Kononovo
 Koptevo
 Korovino
 Kostino
 Kuznechikha
 Levino
 Levinskaya
 Lipin Bor
 Loginovo
 Lukyanovo
 Lunevo
 Lyapino
 Malaya Chagotma
 Maleyevo
 Maleyevo
 Mankovo
 Markovo
 Matveyeva Gora
 Matveyevskaya
 Mitrofanovo
 Monastyrskaya
 Moseyevo
 Moskvino
 Myakishevo
 Myanda
 Mys (Roksomskoye Rural Settlement)
 Mys (Vasilyevskoye Rural Settlement)
 Mytchikovo
 Mytnik
 Nasonovo
 Naumovo
 Nefedovo
 Nesterevo
 Nikolskaya
 Nikolskoye
 Nikonovo
 Nizhneye Khotino
 Novets
 Novokemsky
 Novoselo
 Oktyabrsky
 Ostaninskaya
 Ostrov
 Parfyonovo
 Pavlovo
 Pereyezd
 Pervomaysky
 Petukhovo
 Piksimovo
 Pinshino
 Podgornaya
 Podgorskaya
 Pokrovskoye
 Popovka Munskaya
 Popovka
 Popovka-Pushtorskaya
 Popovka-Volotskaya
 Potashevo
 Potetyuyevo
 Pozdino
 Prokino
 Rechevo
 Rogalevo
 Rostani
 Ryzhikovo
 Salnikovo
 Sapogovo
 Savalikha
 Semenchevo
 Semyanovskaya
 Semyonovskaya
 Shchukino
 Shugino
 Sidorovo
 Skokovo
 Sofronovo
 Srednyaya
 Stanovaya
 Sukhoyezhino
 Tarasyevo
 Timino (Andreyevskoye Rural Settlement)
 Timino (Roksomskoye Rural Settlement)
 Timoshino
 Trifanovo
 Troitskoye
 Troshino
 Turzino
 Tushnaya Gora
 Uglovaya
 Ukhtoma
 Ushakovo (Ivanovsky Selsoviet)
 Ushakovo (Piksimovsky Selsoviet)
 Ustye
 Vashki
 Vasilyevo
 Vasilyevskaya
 Vasyukovo
 Vasyutino
 Veliky Dvor
 Verkhneye Khotino
 Vesnino
 Vesyolaya
 Volkovo
 Vyushino
 Yakunino
 Yekimovo
 Yeskino
 Zadnyaya
 Zarechny
 Zdykhalno
 Zuyevo

Velikoustyugsky District 
Rural localities in Velikoustyugsky District:

 Afurino
 Aksenovo
 Aksenovsky Pochinok
 Alexeyevskaya
 Andronovo
 Anokhinskoye
 Antonovo
 Antsiferovo
 Antushevo
 Aristovo
 Arkhangelskaya Melnitsa
 Bakharevo
 Baranovo
 Barsukovo
 Bayushevskaya
 Belaya
 Belozerovo
 Belozerovo (Rural Settlement)
 Bereznikovo
 Berezovka
 Berezovo
 Birichevo
 Birichevo (Pokrovskoye Rural Settlement)
 Birichevo (Ust-Alexeyevskoye Rural Settlement)
 Blagoveshchenye
 Bobrovnikovo
 Bobykino
 Bolshaya Sinega
 Bolshaya Sloboda
 Bolshiye Slobody
 Bolshoy Dvor
 Bolshoye Chebayevo
 Bolshoye Kalikino
 Bolshoye Voroshnino
 Bolshoye Vostroye
 Bolshoye Yamkino
 Bolshoye Yesiplevo
 Bor
 Borovinka
 Budrino
 Bukhinino
 Bukovo
 Burlevo
 Bushkovo
 Buslayevo
 Bykovo
 Chernakovo
 Chernevo
 Chernyatino
 Chernyshevo
 Chuchery
 Chyornaya
 Davydovskoye
 Demidovo
 Demyanovo
 Derevenka
 Derevenka
 Dernovo
 Dudino
 Energetik
 Falaleyevo
 Fominskaya
 Fyodorovskaya
 Fyodorovskoye
 Galkino
 Gavrino
 Gerasimovo
 Glyadkovo
 Goltsovo
 Gora
 Gorbachevo
 Gorbishchevo
 Gorka (Krasavinskoye Rural Settlement)
 Gorka (Yudinskoye Rural Settlement)
 Gorka-Managorskaya
 Goryayevo
 Gribino
 Grigoryevskoye
 Grishino
 Gruznishchevo
 Ilatovskaya
 Ilyinskoye
 Isakovo
 Ishutino
 Istok
 Ivashevo
 Ivernevo
 Izmarukhovo
 Izoninskaya
 Kalashovo
 Kalikino
 Kalinino
 Karasovo
 Kasyanka
 Khimzavod
 Khorkhorino
 Kichuga
 Klepikovo
 Klimlevo
 Klimovo
 Kochurino
 Kolpakovo
 Konanovo
 Konkovo
 Konshevo
 Kopylovo
 Korobeynikovo
 Korobovo
 Korobovskoye
 Korolyovo (Krasavino Rural Settlement)
 Korolyovo (Pokrovskoye Rural Settlement)
 Koshovo
 Krasavino
 Krasnoye Pole
 Kremenye
 Krivaya Beryoza
 Kulakovo
 Kulnevo
 Kupriyanovo
 Kurakino
 Kurdenga
 Kushalovo
 Kuzminskaya Vystavka
 Kuzminskoye
 Kuznetsovo
 Lenivitsa
 Leonovo
 Lodeyka
 Loginovskaya
 Lomovatka
 Lopatnikovo
 Malaya Gorka
 Malinniki
 Malinovo
 Maloye Chebayevo
 Marilovo
 Martishchevo
 Martynovo
 Medenitsyno
 Medvedki
 Medvezhy Vzvoz
 Mikhaylovskaya
 Mikhninskaya
 Minino
 Mitikhino
 Morozovitsa
 Moseyev Pochinok
 Moskvin Pochinok
 Murdinskaya
 Musino
 Myakalskaya Sloboda
 Myakinnitsyno
 Navolok
 Nemonovo
 Nikulino (Opokskoye Rural Settlement)
 Nikulino (Yudinskoye Rural Settlement)
 Nizhneye Anisimovo
 Nizhneye Gribtsovo
 Nizhneye Pankratovo
 Nizhneye Priluk
 Nizhnyaya Kichuga
 Nokshino
 Novator
 Novaya Derevnya
 Novosyolovo (Nizhneshardengskoye Rural Settlement)
 Novosyolovo (Pokrovskoye Rural Settlement)
 Novoye Rozhkovo
 Novoye Selo
 Obradovo
 Odomchino
 Ogoryltsevo
 Olennikovo
 Onbovo
 Opalipsovo
 Orlovo
 Palema
 Pantusovo
 Parfyonovo
 Parfyonovskaya Vystavka
 Parshino (Orlovskoye Rural Settlement)
 Parshino (Shemogodskoye Rural Settlement)
 Pavlovo
 Pavlovskoye
 Paykino
 Peganovo
 Penye
 Peremilovo
 Pervomayskoye
 Pestovo (Nizhneshardengsky Selsoviet)
 Pestovo (Teplogorsky Selsoviet)
 Pestovo (Tregubovsky Selsoviet)
 Petrovskaya
 Pikhtovo
 Pleso
 Podberezye
 Podborye
 Podgorye
 Podsosenye
 Podugorye
 Podvalye
 Podvolochye
 Podvorskiye
 Pogorelovo
 Poldarsa
 Poldarsa
 Polutino
 Polutovo
 Popovkino
 Popovskoye
 Porog
 Pozharishche
 Pozharovo
 Priluki (settlement)
 Priluki (village)
 Prislon
 Pupyshevo
 Pushkarikha
 Rodionovitsa
 Rogozinino
 Rovdino
 Rozhkovo
 Rukavishnikovo
 Ruposovo
 Sakovo
 Savino
 Selivanovo
 Semennikovo
 Severny
 Shastovo
 Shatrovo
 Shchekino
 Shilenga
 Skornyakovo
 Skorodum
 Skoryatino
 Slinkino
 Slizovitsa
 Slobodka (Parfenovsky Selsoviet)
 Slobodka (Veliky Ustyug)
 Sludka
 Smolinskaya Vystavka
 Sokolovo
 Solovyovo
 Sotnikovo
 Starina
 Starkovo
 Striga
 Stryukovo
 Studyonoye
 Sukhonsky
 Sulinskaya
 Susolovka
 Syvorotkino
 Teltevo
 Telyachye
 Teplogorye
 Tomashevo
 Udachino
 Ugol
 Ulyanitsa
 Urzhumovo
 Ust-Alexeyevo
 Ustye Povalikhino
 Utkino
 Valga
 Vargalovo
 Varzhenskaya Zaimka
 Vasilyevo
 Vasilyevskoye
 Veprevo
 Verkhneye Anisimovo
 Verkhneye Borodkino
 Verkhneye Gribtsovo
 Verkhneye Pankratovo
 Verkhneye Yakutino
 Verkhny Zayemkuch
 Verkhnyaya Kichuga
 Verkhnyaya Shardenga
 Vlasovo (Nizhneshardengskoye Rural Settlement)
 Vlasovo (Samotovinskoye Rural Settlement)
 Voronino
 Vozdvizhenye
 Vypolzovo
 Vysokaya
 Yednovo
 Yeremeyevo
 Yershovo
 Yezekiyevo
 Yudino
 Yushkovo
 Zagorye (Nizhneyerogodskoye Rural Settlement)
 Zagorye (Verkhneshardengskoye Rural Settlement)
 Zaozeritsa
 Zaozerye
 Zapan Bobrovnikovo
 Zaruchevye
 Zayamzha
 Zherebyatyevo
 Zhukovo
 Zhuravlevo
 Zolotavtsevo

Verkhovazhsky District 
Rural localities in Verkhovazhsky District:

 Abakumovskaya
 Afoninskaya (Nizhne-Vazhskoye Rural Settlement)
 Afoninskaya (Shelotskoye Rural Settlement)
 Akinkhovskaya
 Aksenovskaya
 Andreyevskaya
 Anisimovskaya
 Anisimovskaya (Shelotskoye Rural Settlement)
 Artemyevskaya
 Balanovskaya
 Barabanovo
 Basaylovo
 Bereg
 Bezymyannaya
 Biryuchevskaya
 Bolshedvorskaya
 Bolshoye Pogorelovo
 Bolshoye Yefimovo
 Borisovskaya
 Borovaya Pustosh
 Borovichikha
 Borovina
 Borovskaya
 Bosyginskaya
 Botyzhnaya
 Boyarskaya
 Brevnovskaya
 Bumazhnaya Fabrika
 Bushnitskaya
 Chavrovskaya
 Cheryomushki
 Chushevitsy
 Denisovskaya
 Dor
 Doroninskaya
 Doroshevitsa
 Dresvyanka (Chushevitskoye Rural Settlement)
 Dresvyanka (Shelotskoye Rural Settlement)
 Drugosimonovskaya
 Dubrova (Chushevitskoye Rural Settlement)
 Dubrova (Lipetskoye Rural Settlement)
 Dudorovo
 Duravinskaya
 Dyakonovskaya
 Feklukha
 Filinskaya
 Filinskaya (Nizhne-Vazhskoye Rural Settlement)
 Fominogorskaya
 Fominskaya (Kolengsky Selsoviet)
 Fominskaya (Morozovsky Selsoviet)
 Frolovskaya
 Garmanovo
 Gerasimovskaya
 Gniluzhskaya
 Gorka (Lipetskoye Rural Settlement)
 Gorka (Naumovsky Selsoviet)
 Gorka (Termengsky Selsoviet)
 Gorka-Nazarovskaya
 Gridino
 Grigorovskaya
 Grikhnevskaya
 Istopochnaya
 Ivanovskaya (Lipetsky Selsoviet)
 Ivanovskaya (Nizhne-Vazhskoye Rural Settlement)
 Ivanovskaya (Sibirsky Selsoviet)
 Ivonino
 Ivoninskaya
 Kalichye
 Kalinino
 Kamenka
 Kaychikha
 Kharitonovskaya
 Kharitonovskaya (Sibirskoye Rural Settlement)
 Khoroshevo
 Kiselevo
 Klimushino
 Klykovo
 Klyukinskaya
 Koptyayevskaya
 Korovino
 Kostyuninskaya
 Kostyuninskaya (Nizhne-Vazhskoye Rural Settlement)
 Kozevskaya
 Krasulino
 Krylovskaya
 Kudrino
 Kudrinskaya
 Kukolovskaya
 Labaznoye
 Leonovskaya
 Leushinskaya
 Lymzino
 Makarovskaya
 Makartsevo
 Maloye Pogorelovo
 Maloye Yefimovo
 Markovskaya
 Martynovskaya
 Mashkovskaya
 Matveyevskaya (Chushevitskoye Rural Settlement)
 Matveyevskaya (Verkhovsky Selsoviet)
 Mikhalevo
 Mikhaylovskaya
 Mininskaya
 Moiseyevskaya
 Moiseyevskaya
 Mokiyevskaya
 Mokiyevskaya
 Morozovo
 Moseyevo
 Motovilovo
 Mys
 Naumikha
 Nikolskaya
 Nikulinskaya
 Nivskaya
 Noginskaya
 Novaya Derevnya
 Olotinskaya
 Orekhovskaya
 Osnovinskaya
 Ostashevskaya
 Ostrovskaya
 Pakhomovskaya
 Papinskaya
 Parishchevo
 Payus
 Pestrukha
 Petrakovskaya
 Petrovskaya
 Pezhma
 Pikhtenik
 Pisuninskaya
 Ploskovo
 Plyoso
 Podsosenye
 Pogost Ilyinsky
 Potulovskaya
 Priluk
 Pukirevo
 Pyatino
 Rodionovskaya
 Rogachikha
 Rogna
 Rostovo
 Ruchyevskaya
 Ryapolovskaya
 Safronovskaya
 Sakulinskaya
 Samovo
 Savinskaya
 Savkovo
 Sboyevskaya
 Sekushinskaya
 Semyonovskaya
 Sergeyevskaya
 Shchekino
 Shchekotovskaya
 Shelota
 Silinskaya-1
 Silinskaya-2
 Simonovskaya
 Skulinskaya
 Sludnaya
 Smetanino
 Somitsyno
 Spirino
 Spitsynskaya
 Srednyaya
 Stepachevskaya
 Stepanovo
 Stikhovskaya
 Stolbovo
 Studentsevo
 Svetilnovo
 Tatarinskaya
 Terentyevskaya
 Titovskaya
 Tolstukha
 Tyoply Ruchey
 Udaltsovskaya
 Ulyankovo
 Urusovskaya
 Vakhrushevo
 Velikodvorskaya
 Verkhneye Makarovo
 Verkhovazhye
 Vladykina Gora
 Voronikha
 Voronovskaya
 Vysokoye
 Vysotinskaya
 Yakuninskaya
 Yalnichevskaya
 Yeksinskoye
 Yeliseyevskaya
 Yereminskoye
 Yevsyuninskaya
 Zabolotye
 Zakharovskaya (Morozovsky Selsoviet)
 Zakharovskaya (Sibirsky Selsoviet)
 Zhavoronkovo
 Zuyevskiye
 Zveglevitsy

Vologda Urban Okrug 
Rural localities in Vologda Urban Okrug:

 Molochnoye

Vologodsky District 
Rural localities in Vologodsky District:

 Abakanovo
 Abakshino
 Abramovo
 Abramtsevo
 Afanasovo
 Aksenovo
 Akulovo
 Aleshino
 Alexandrovo
 Alexandrovskoye
 Alexeyevo
 Alexeyevo
 Alexeyevo
 Alexino (Novlenskoye Rural Settlement)
 Alexino (Semyonkovskoye Rural Settlement)
 Alexino (Staroselskoye Rural Settlement)
 Anchakovo
 Anchutino
 Andrakovo
 Andreyevskoye
 Andronino
 Andronovo (Nesvoysky Selsoviet)
 Andronovo (Veprevsky Selsoviet)
 Androntsevo
 Andryushino
 Anfalovo
 Antonovo (Kubenskoye Rural Settlement)
 Antonovo (Novlenskoye Rural Settlement)
 Antsiferovo (Sosnovskoye Rural Settlement)
 Antsiferovo (Spasskoye Rural Settlement)
 Avdeyevo
 Babik
 Babikovo
 Babtsyno
 Bagrino
 Baklanikha
 Balobanovo
 Barachevo
 Barachevo
 Baralovo
 Barskoye
 Barskukovo
 Bedrino
 Beglovo
 Beketovo
 Beloye (Mayskoye Rural Settlement)
 Beloye (Staroselskoye Rural Settlement)
 Berezhok
 Bereznik
 Berezovka
 Besednoye
 Bilkovo
 Bobrovskoye
 Bogorodskoye
 Bolotovo
 Bolshoy Dvor
 Bolshoye Chertishchevo
 Bolshoye
 Boltino
 Boltutino
 Borborino
 Borilovo
 Borilovo-2
 Borisoglebskoye
 Borisovo (Kubenskoye Rural Settlement)
 Borisovo (Prilukskoye Rural Settlement)
 Borodkino
 Bovykino
 Bragino
 Brodki
 Bryacha
 Bubyrevo
 Bugrino
 Burdukovo
 Burtsevo
 Buyanovo
 Chakhlovo
 Chemodanovo
 Cherepanikha
 Chernevo
 Cherneyevo
 Chuprovo
 Davydkovo
 Dekteri
 Demino (Nesvoysky Selsoviet)
 Demino (Vysokovsky Selsoviet)
 Derevenka
 Dereventsevo
 Derevkovo
 Derevyagino
 Dikaya
 Dilyalevo
 Dityatyevo
 Dmitriyevo
 Dmitriyevskoye (Novlensky Selsoviet)
 Dmitriyevskoye (Spassky Selsoviet)
 Dolgovo
 Dolgovo
 Domanovo
 Dor (Kubenskoye Rural Settlement)
 Dor (Pudegsky Selsoviet)
 Dor (Staroselsky Selsoviet)
 Dorkovo
 Doronkino
 Dorozhny
 Dovodchikovo
 Drozdovo
 Dubrovo
 Dubrovskoye
 Dudinskoye
 Dulepovo
 Dulovo (Kubenskoye Rural Settlement)
 Dulovo (Staroselskoye Rural Settlement)
 Duplino
 Duravino
 Durnevo
 Dyakontsevo
 Dyakovo
 Dyatkino
 Dyukovo
 Faleleyevo
 Fenino
 Fetinino
 Filisovo
 Filkino
 Filyutino
 Fofantsevo
 Fomkino
 Frolovskoye
 Fryazinovo
 GES
 Gavrilovo
 Glotovo
 Golenevo
 Golubkovo
 Goncharka
 Gorbovo (Novlenskoye Rural Settlement)
 Gorbovo (Sosnovskoye Rural Settlement)
 Gorka (Mayskoye Rural Settlement)
 Gorka (Staroselskoye Rural Settlement)
 Gorka-Ilyinskaya
 Gorka-Pokrovskaya
 Gorka-Pokrovskaya
 Gornoye
 Gorshkovo
 Gribkovo
 Gridenskoye
 Grishino
 Grozilovo
 Gulyayevo
 Gureikha
 Gureyevo
 Ignachevo
 Ignatovo
 Ilekino
 Ilyinskoye (Maysky Selsoviet)
 Ilyinskoye (Raboche-Krestyansky Selsoviet)
 Indalovo
 Irkhino
 Isakovo (Novlenskoye Rural Settlement)
 Isakovo (Sosnovskoye Rural Settlement)
 Isakovo (Staroselskoye Rural Settlement)
 Isayevo (Novlenskoye Rural Settlement)
 Ivakino
 Ivanovka
 Ivanovskoye (Markovsky Selsoviet)
 Ivanovskoye (Spassky Selsoviet)
 Ivanovskoye (Veprevsky Selsoviet)
 Ivashevo
 Ivatino
 Ivlevo
 Ivlevskoye
 Kalinkino
 Kargachevo
 Karpovskoye
 Kartsevo
 Kashkalino
 Katalovskoye
 Katunino
 Kedrovo
 Kelebardovo
 Kharachevo
 Khokhlevo
 Khomyakovo
 Khorobrets
 Khrebtovo
 Khripilevo
 Kindeyevo
 Kipelovo
 Kiriki-Ulita
 Kishkino
 Kishkino
 Kishkintso
 Klokunovo
 Klyushnikovo
 Knyaginino
 Knyazevo
 Knyazhevo
 Knyazhovo
 Kocheurovo
 Kolbino
 Kolbino
 Kolkino
 Kolokolovo
 Kolotilovo
 Koltseyevo
 Kolyshkino
 Komarovo
 Konishchevo
 Konshino
 Konstantinovo
 Koptsevo
 Kopylovo
 Korenevo
 Korobovo
 Korotkovo
 Kortsevo
 Korytovo
 Koskovo
 Kostino
 Kostromino
 Kosyakovo
 Kotelnikovo
 Kotlovo
 Kovshovo
 Kovylevo
 Kozhevnikovo
 Kozhino
 Kozino
 Kozitsyno
 Kraskovo
 Krasnovo
 Krasny Dvor
 Krivoye
 Kruglitsa
 Krugolka
 Kryazhevo
 Kryukovo
 Kuchino
 Kudrino
 Kudryavtsevo
 Kulakovo
 Kulemesovo
 Kuleshevo
 Kunovo
 Kurbatovo
 Kurdumovo
 Kurkino (Mayskoye Rural Settlement)
 Kurkino (Novlenskoye Rural Settlement)
 Kurovo
 Kurovskoye
 Kushchuba
 Kusyevo
 Kuvshinovo
 Kuzminskoye
 Kuznetsovka
 Lakhmino
 Lantyevo
 Lapach
 Larkino
 Laskovtsevo
 Lavkino
 Lavrentyevo
 Lebzino
 Legkoye
 Leskovo
 Leushkino
 Lifino
 Liminsky
 Linkovo
 Lisitsyno
 Lobkovo
 Lomtevo
 Loptunovo
 Luchnikovo
 Lukintsevo
 Lumba
 Lyagalovo
 Lyzlovo
 Makarovo (Kubenskoye Rural Settlement)
 Makarovo (Leskovskoye Rural Settlement)
 Makarovo (Novlenskoye Rural Settlement)
 Malashkovo
 Malaya Gorka
 Malgino
 Malonovlenskoye
 Maloye Chertishchevo
 Manino
 Mardasovo
 Marfino
 Markovo (Leskovsky Selsoviet)
 Markovo (Markovsky Selsoviet)
 Maryino
 Maryinskoye (Novlenskoye Rural Settlement)
 Maryinskoye (Semyonkovskoye Rural Settlement)
 Maryukhino
 Maslozavod
 Maslozavod
 Matveyevskoye (Kubensky Selsoviet)
 Matveyevskoye (Markovsky Selsoviet)
 Matveyevskoye (Novlenskoye Rural Settlement)
 Maurino
 Maurino (Podlesnoye Rural Settlement)
 Maurino (Spasskoye Rural Settlement)
 Maximishchevo
 Maxino
 Mayega
 Maysky
 Meldan
 Melnikovo
 Meniki
 Menshovskoye
 Michkovo
 Midyanovo
 Migunovo
 Mikhalevo (Novlenskoye Rural Settlement)
 Mikhalevo (Podlesnoye Rural Settlement)
 Mikhaltsevo
 Milkovo
 Mineyka
 Minino (Kubenskoye Rural Settlement)
 Minino (Novlenskoye Rural Settlement)
 Mironositsa
 Mitenskoye
 Mitenskoye
 Mitropolye
 Mityukovo
 Molbishcha
 Molitvino
 Molochnaya
 Morino
 Moseykovo
 Mostishcha
 Mozhayskoye
 Muravyovo
 Myagrino
 Mynchakovo
 Myshkino
 Nadeyeyvo
 Nagornoye
 Nagoronovo
 Nagorskoye
 Natsepino
 Nazarovo
 Nefedovo
 Nekrasovo
 Nepotyagovo
 Nesterovskoye
 Nesvoyskoye
 Neverovskoye
 Nevinnikovo
 Nikiforovo
 Nikitino (Semyonkovskoye Rural Settlement)
 Nikitino (Spasskoye Rural Settlement)
 Nikulino (Kuebnskoye Rural Settlement)
 Nikulino (Markovskoye Rural Settlement)
 Nikulino (Mayskoye Rural Settlement)
 Nikulinskoye
 Nizhneye
 Nizma
 Norobovo
 Novgorodovo
 Novlenskoye
 Novoye (Kubenskoye Rural Settlement)
 Novoye (Leskovskoye Rural Settlement)
 Novoye (Sosnovskoye Rural Settlement)
 Novoye (Staroselskoye Rural Settlement)
 Novy Istochnik
 Obraztsovo
 Obrosovo
 Obsakovo
 Obukhovo (Kubenskoye Rural Settlement)
 Obukhovo (Semyonkovskoye Rural Settlement)
 Obukhovo (Staroselskoye Rural Settlement)
 Odoleikha
 Ogarkovo
 Ogibalovo
 Okhlopkovo
 Okulovo
 Olekhovo
 Oleshevo
 Omogayevo
 Opikhalino
 Opuchkovo
 Oreshnik
 Orlovo
 Osinnik
 Osinovka
 Osipovo
 Ostakhovo
 Ostanino
 Ostashevo
 Ostretsovo
 Ostretsovo
 Ostyunino
 Otekleyevo
 Otradnoye
 Ovsyannikovo
 Ozerkovo
 Pailovo
 Pakhtalovo
 Palkino
 Panovo
 Panteleyevo
 Papino
 Paprikha
 Parichino
 Pashinka
 Pavlikovo
 Pavlovo
 Pavshino (Kubenskoye Rural Settlement)
 Pavshino (Novlenskoye Rural Settlement)
 Perkhuryevo
 Perkhuryevo
 Peryevo
 Peryevo
 Peski
 Pesochnoye
 Pestovo
 Petrakovo (Mayskoye Rural Settlement)
 Petrakovo (Novlenskoye Rural Settlement)
 Petrovskoye
 Petrushino
 Pevomaysky
 Pirogovo
 Pishchalino
 Plyushchevo
 Pochenga
 Pochinok (Kipelovsky Selsoviet)
 Pochinok (Kubenskoye Rural Settlement)
 Pochinok (Leskovskoye Rural Settlement)
 Pochinok (Spasskoye Rural Settlement)
 Pochinok-2
 Podberevskoye
 Podberezye
 Podgorye
 Podol
 Podomartsevo
 Pogorelka
 Pogorelovo (Kubenskoye Rural Settlement)
 Pogorelovo (Sosnovskoye Rural Settlement)
 Pogost Dmitriyevsky
 Pogost Onochest
 Pogost Voskresenye
 Pogostets
 Pokrovskoye
 Polyanki
 Polyany
 Pomygalovo
 Popadyino
 Popovka (Mayskoye Rural Settlement)
 Popovka (Novlenskoye Rural Settlement)
 Popovka (Semyonkovskoye Rural Settlement)
 Popovo
 Popovskoye. Kubenskoye Rural Settlement
 Posykino
 Potanino
 Potrokhovo
 Pribytkovo
 Pribytkovo
 Prokhorovo
 Prokino (Novlenskoye Rural Settlement)
 Prokino (Staroselskoye Rural Settlement)
 Prokunino (Leskovskoye Rural Settlement)
 Prokunino (Staroselskoye Rural Settlement)
 Puchinino
 Pudega
 Putyatino
 Raskopino
 Rebrovo
 Redkino
 Reshetnikovo
 Rezvino
 Rodiontsevo
 Rogachyovo
 Rogozkino
 Romanovo
 Roslovskoye
 Roslyatino
 Rossolovo
 Rubtsovo
 Runovo
 Sarayevo
 Savkino
 Sazonovo
 Selezentsevo
 Seleznevo
 Selishcha
 Semenkovo (Goncharovsky Selsoviet)
 Semenkovo (Oktyabrsky Selsoviet)
 Semenkovo (Semenkovsky Selsoviet)
 Semenkovo (Staroselskoye Rural Settlement)
 Semigory
 Semigorye
 Semryukhovo
 Semshino
 Semyonovskoye (Novlensky Selsoviet)
 Semyonovskoye (Podlesnoy Selsoviet)
 Seredneye
 Sestrilka
 Sevastyanovo
 Severnaya Ferma
 Severovo
 Shadrino
 Shatalovo
 Shchapilino
 Shchekino
 Shcherbinino
 Shchetnikovo
 Shchipino
 Shchukarevo
 Shelygino
 Shilovo
 Shirogorye
 Shiryayevo
 Sholokhovo
 Shulgino
 Sidelnikovo
 Sidorovo
 Silino
 Sindosh
 Sinitsyno
 Skorbezhevo
 Skresenskoye
 Skripilovo
 Skryabino
 Slobodishcha
 Smykovo
 Snasudovo
 Sopyatino
 Sosnovka
 Spass
 Spasskoye
 Sporyshevo
 Stralevo
 Strelkovo
 Sukholomovo
 Sukholzhino
 Sulinskoye
 Susolovo
 Svetilki
 Svobodny Ugol
 Syama
 Sychevo
 Taraskovo
 Tarasovo
 Tatarinovo
 Tatarovo
 Telyachyevo
 Terpelka
 Tishinovo
 Trofimovo
 Trufanovo
 Tsypoglazovo
 Tupochelovo
 Turutino
 Tyutryumovo
 Utkino
 Vakhnevo
 Vakhrushevo
 Varlamovo
 Vasilyevskoye
 Vasilyovo
 Vasnevo
 Vasyunino
 Vatlanovo
 Vedrakovo
 Vedrovo
 Velikoye (Kubenskoye Rural Settlement)
 Velikoye (Prilukskoye Rural Settlement)
 Veprevo
 Vepri
 Vetskoye
 Viktovo
 Vinnikovo
 Virlovo
 Viselkino
 Vladychnevo
 Vladychnevo
 Vlasyevo
 Vodogino
 Volkovo (Podlesnoye Rural Settlement)
 Volkovo (Spasskoye Rural Settlement)
 Volochaninovo
 Volshnitsy
 Voronino
 Voskresenskoye (Kubenskoye Rural Settlement)
 Voskresenskoye (Sosnovskoye Rural Settlement)
 Votolino
 Vozdvizhenye
 Vysochka
 Vysokovo
 Vysokovo-1 (Kubenskoye Rural Settlement)
 Vysokovo-1 (Novlenskoye Rural Settlement)
 Vysokovo-2
 Yakovlevskoye
 Yakovtsevo
 Yakunino
 Yaminovo
 Yangosar
 Yarilovo
 Yarunovo
 Yarygino
 Yefimovo
 Yelgino
 Yelizarovo
 Yeltsyno
 Yelyakovo
 Yemelyanovo
 Yepifanka
 Yeremeyevo (Leskovskoye Rural Settlement)
 Yeremeyevo (Novlenskoye Rural Settlement)
 Yermakovo
 Yermolovo (Kubenskoye Rural Settlement)
 Yermolovo (Mayskoye Rural Settlement)
 Yermolovskoye
 Yerofeyka
 Yeskino
 Yesyukovo
 Yesyunino
 Yevlashevo
 Yurovo
 Yuryevo
 Yuryevtsevo
 Zabolotnoye
 Zabolotye
 Zakharovo
 Zakharyino
 Zakobyaykino
 Zakryshkino
 Zalomaikha
 Zaonikiyevo
 Zaprudka
 Zarechnaya
 Zarya
 Zazvitsevo
 Zhavoronkovo
 Zhilino
 Zhukovo
 Zrelovo
 Zuyevo

Vozhegodsky District 
Rural localities in Vozhegodsky District:

 Abaturikha
 Agafonovskaya
 Alferyevskaya
 Andreyevskaya
 Anisimovskaya
 Ankudinovskaya
 Antsiferovskaya
 Antsiferovskaya (Yavengskoye Rural Settlement)
 Anufriyevskaya
 Baranikha
 Baranovskaya
 Barkanovskaya
 Baza
 Beketovo
 Beketovskaya
 Belavinskaya
 Blinovskaya
 Bolshaya Klimovskaya
 Bolshaya Nazarovskaya
 Bolshoye Ramenye
 Bor
 Borisovo
 Boyarskaya
 Bucherovskaya
 Bukhara
 Bykovo
 Bykovskaya (Yavengskoye Rural Settlement)
 Bykovskaya (Yuchkinskoye Rural Settlement)
 Checheninskaya
 Chernovskaya
 Chichirino
 Danilovskaya
 Derevenka
 Dorkovskaya
 Dorovikha
 Drovdil
 Dubrovinskaya
 Fatyanovo
 Fedyayevskaya
 Fedyuninskaya
 Filatovskaya
 Fominskaya
 Fomishchevo
 Funikovo
 Galuninskaya
 Gashkovo
 Glazunovskaya
 Gora (Tiginskoye Rural Settlement)
 Gora (Yavengskoye Rural Settlement)
 Gorka (Beketovskoye Rural Settlement)
 Gorka (Mishutinskoye Rural Settlement)
 Gridinskaya
 Grishinskaya
 Grishkovskaya
 Gubinskaya
 Ignatovskaya
 Isakovo
 Isakovskaya
 Ivankovo
 Ivanovskaya (Mishutinsky Selsoviet)
 Ivanovskaya (Vozhegodsky Selsoviet)
 Ivoninskaya
 Kadnikovsky
 Karpovskaya
 Karpovskaya
 Khmelevskaya
 Khmylitsa
 Khodinskaya
 Kholdynka
 Kholuy
 Khvostovo (Beketovskoye Rural Settlement)
 Khvostovo (Yuchkinskoye Rural Settlement)
 Kladovka
 Klimovskaya (Mishutinsky Selsoviet)
 Klimovskaya (Nizhneslobodsky Selsoviet)
 Konechnaya (Lipino-Kalikinsky Selsoviet)
 Konechnaya (Punemsky Selsoviet)
 Konevka
 Korgozero
 Korotkovskaya
 Korotyginskaya
 Korovinskaya
 Koryakinskaya
 Kostyuninskaya
 Kozlovo (Beketovskoye Rural Settlement)
 Kozlovo (Yavengskoye Rural Settlement)
 Krapivino
 Kropufinskaya
 Kubinskaya
 Kuklinskaya
 Kuritsino
 Kurshiyevskaya
 Kutilovo
 Kuznetsovskaya
 Leshchevka
 Levinskaya (Nizhneslobodskoye Rural Settlement)
 Levinskaya (Tiginskoye Rural Settlement)
 Levkovskaya
 Lobanikha
 Loshchinskaya
 Lukyanovskaya
 Lupachikha
 Malaya Nazarovskaya
 Malaya
 Maleyevskaya
 Maloye Ramenye
 Manuilovskaya
 Maryinskaya
 Matveyevskaya
 Miguyevskaya
 Mikhaylovskaya
 Mikheyevskaya
 Mishutinskaya
 Mitinskaya (Nizhneslobodskoye Rural Settlement)
 Mitinskaya (Yavengskoye Rural Settlement)
 Mitrofanovo
 Molodyozhny
 Munskaya
 Mushchininskaya
 Myshino
 Mytnik
 Nadporozhye
 Navolok
 Nazarovskaya
 Nefedovskaya
 Nefedovskaya
 Nekrasovskaya
 Nikitino
 Nikitinskaya
 Nikolskaya
 Nikulskaya
 Nizhnyaya
 Novaya
 Novozhilikha
 Ogarkovskaya
 Ogibalovo
 Okulovskaya (Nizhneslobodsky Selsoviet)
 Okulovskaya (Ramensky Selsoviet)
 Okulovskaya-1
 Olekhovskaya
 Olshukovskaya
 Olyushino
 Olyushinskaya
 Osiyevskaya
 Ospodarevskaya
 Otradnoye
 Ozhiginskaya
 Padinskaya
 Pankovo
 Panteleyevskaya
 Patrakeyevskaya
 Pavlovskaya (Nizhneslobodsky Selsoviet)
 Pavlovskaya (Vozhegodsky Selsoviet)
 Pavlovskaya (Yavengsky Selsoviet)
 Pekhtach
 Pelevikha
 Perepechikha
 Peshkovo
 Pesok (Tavengsky Selsoviet)
 Pesok (Tiginsky Selsoviet)
 Pestinskaya
 Petrovka
 Petrovo
 Petrovskaya
 Pilyevo
 Podolnaya
 Podsosenye
 Pogorelka
 Pogorelovo
 Pokrovskaya
 Pokrovskoye
 Popovka Kalikinskaya
 Popovka (Mishutinskoye Rural Settlement)
 Popovka (Vozhegodskoye Urban Settlement)
 Popovka (Yukchinskoye Rural Settlement)
 Porokhino
 Pozdeyevskaya
 Pozhar
 Pozharishche
 Proletarsky
 Rakishevo
 Repnyakovskaya
 Rubtsovo
 Ruchyevskaya
 Safonovskaya
 Salnik
 Samoylovskaya
 Savinskaya (Tiginsky Selsoviet)
 Savinskaya (Vozhegodsky Selsoviet)
 Semyonovskaya (Beketovsky Selsoviet)
 Semyonovskaya (Yavengskoye Rural Settlement)
 Senkinskaya
 Shchegolikha
 Shchekotovskaya
 Sigovskaya
 Soroginskaya
 Sorozhinskaya
 Sosnovitsa
 Stepanikha (Tiginskoye Rural Settlement)
 Stepanikha (Vozhegodskoye Urban Settlement)
 Stepanovskaya
 Stolbikha
 Strokavino
 Surkovskaya
 Syamba
 Syrnevo
 Tarasovskaya (Beketovsky Selsoviet)
 Tarasovskaya (Yavengskoye Rural Settlement)
 Tigino
 Timoninskaya
 Timoshinskaya
 Tingotomo
 Todelovskaya
 Tupitsyno
 Turabovskaya
 Turovo
 Tyurikovskaya
 Uglenskaya
 Ugol
 Ulitinskaya
 Vafunenskaya
 Vasilyevskaya (Yavengskoye Rural Settlement)
 Vasilyevskaya (Yuchkinskoye Rural Settlement)
 Vershina
 Voskresenskoye
 Vysokaya
 Yagrysh
 Yakhrenga
 Yakovlevo
 Yakuninskaya
 Yakushevskaya
 Yakutinskaya
 Yefimovskaya
 Yekimovskaya
 Yelenskaya
 Yemelyanovskaya
 Yereminskaya
 Yesinskaya
 Yeskinskaya
 Yurkovskaya
 Zabereznik
 Zaozerye
 Zarechnaya
 Zasukhonskaya
 Zavrag
 Zinenskaya
 Zuyevo

Vytegorsky District 
Rural localities in Vytegorsky District:

 Agafonovskaya
 Alexandrovskoye
 Andreyevskaya
 Annensky Most
 Antsiferovo
 Antsiferovskaya
 Badozhsky Pogost
 Bely Ruchey
 Bereg
 Bessonovo
 Blizhnyaya Kardanka
 Chekovo
 Deminskaya
 Gorny Ruchey
 Ignatovo
 Ivakovskaya
 Ivanovskaya (Vytegorsky District)
 Kabetsovo
 Kanshino
 Kardanga
 Karpovskaya
 Kostruchey
 Koybino
 Kryukovskaya
 Kurvoshsky Pogost
 Kuzminka
 Kuzminskaya
 Kyabelovo
 Lakhnovo
 Loychino
 Matveyevo
 Mironovo
 Morozovo
 Nikulino
 Nizhneye Ponizovye
 Nizhnyaya Vodlitsa
 Novostroyka
 Oktyabrsky
 Oshta
 Paltoga
 Pavshozero
 Prokshino
 Pryachevo
 Rogozino
 Rubtsovo
 Saminsky Pogost
 Semyonovskaya
 Shchekino
 Sidorovo
 Silovo
 Simanovo
 Sorochye Pole
 Sorokopolye
 Spitsyno
 Sredny Rubezh
 Staroye Petrovskoye
 Startsevo
 Syargozero
 Tatarikha
 Terovo
 Titovo
 Troshigino
 Tudozersky Pogost
 Ustye
 Uzhla
 Vashukovo
 Verkhny Rubezh
 Verkhnyaya Vodlitsa
 Volokov Most
 Yakshino
 Yelinskaya
 Yevsinskaya
 Zagorodskaya
 Zhelvachevo

See also 
 
 Lists of rural localities in Russia

References 

Vologda Oblast